= List of years =

This page is an index to individual articles for years. Years are shown in chronological order.

== 1st millennium BC ==
=== 6th century BC ===
- 580
- 579
- 578
- 577
- 576
- 575
- 574
- 573
- 572
- 571
- 570
- 569
- 568
- 567
- 566
- 565
- 564
- 563
- 562
- 561
- 560
- 559
- 558
- 557
- 556
- 555
- 554
- 553
- 552
- 551
- 550
- 549
- 548
- 547
- 546
- 545
- 544
- 543
- 542
- 541
- 540
- 539
- 538
- 537
- 536
- 535
- 534
- 533
- 532
- 531
- 530
- 529
- 528
- 527
- 526
- 525
- 524
- 523
- 522
- 521
- 520
- 519
- 518
- 517
- 516
- 515
- 514
- 513
- 512
- 511
- 510
- 509
- 508
- 507
- 506
- 505
- 504
- 503
- 502
- 501

=== 5th century BC ===
- 500
- 499
- 498
- 497
- 496
- 495
- 494
- 493
- 492
- 491
- 490
- 489
- 488
- 487
- 486
- 485
- 484
- 483
- 482
- 481
- 480
- 479
- 478
- 477
- 476
- 475
- 474
- 473
- 472
- 471
- 470
- 469
- 468
- 467
- 466
- 465
- 464
- 463
- 462
- 461
- 460
- 459
- 458
- 457
- 456
- 455
- 454
- 453
- 452
- 451
- 450
- 449
- 448
- 447
- 446
- 445
- 444
- 443
- 442
- 441
- 440
- 439
- 438
- 437
- 436
- 435
- 434
- 433
- 432
- 431
- 430
- 429
- 428
- 427
- 426
- 425
- 424
- 423
- 422
- 421
- 420
- 419
- 418
- 417
- 416
- 415
- 414
- 413
- 412
- 411
- 410
- 409
- 408
- 407
- 406
- 405
- 404
- 403
- 402
- 401

=== 4th century BC ===
- 400
- 399
- 398
- 397
- 396
- 395
- 394
- 393
- 392
- 391
- 390
- 389
- 388
- 387
- 386
- 385
- 384
- 383
- 382
- 381
- 380
- 379
- 378
- 377
- 376
- 375
- 374
- 373
- 372
- 371
- 370
- 369
- 368
- 367
- 366
- 365
- 364
- 363
- 362
- 361
- 360
- 359
- 358
- 357
- 356
- 355
- 354
- 353
- 352
- 351
- 350
- 349
- 348
- 347
- 346
- 345
- 344
- 343
- 342
- 341
- 340
- 339
- 338
- 337
- 336
- 335
- 334
- 333
- 332
- 331
- 330
- 329
- 328
- 327
- 326
- 325
- 324
- 323
- 322
- 321
- 320
- 319
- 318
- 317
- 316
- 315
- 314
- 313
- 312
- 311
- 310
- 309
- 308
- 307
- 306
- 305
- 304
- 303
- 302
- 301

=== 3rd century BC ===
- 300
- 299
- 298
- 297
- 296
- 295
- 294
- 293
- 292
- 291
- 290
- 289
- 288
- 287
- 286
- 285
- 284
- 283
- 282
- 281
- 280
- 279
- 278
- 277
- 276
- 275
- 274
- 273
- 272
- 271
- 270
- 269
- 268
- 267
- 266
- 265
- 264
- 263
- 262
- 261
- 260
- 259
- 258
- 257
- 256
- 255
- 254
- 253
- 252
- 251
- 250
- 249
- 248
- 247
- 246
- 245
- 244
- 243
- 242
- 241
- 240
- 239
- 238
- 237
- 236
- 235
- 234
- 233
- 232
- 231
- 230
- 229
- 228
- 227
- 226
- 225
- 224
- 223
- 222
- 221
- 220
- 219
- 218
- 217
- 216
- 215
- 214
- 213
- 212
- 211
- 210
- 209
- 208
- 207
- 206
- 205
- 204
- 203
- 202
- 201

=== 2nd century BC ===
- 200
- 199
- 198
- 197
- 196
- 195
- 194
- 193
- 192
- 191
- 190
- 189
- 188
- 187
- 186
- 185
- 184
- 183
- 182
- 181
- 180
- 179
- 178
- 177
- 176
- 175
- 174
- 173
- 172
- 171
- 170
- 169
- 168
- 167
- 166
- 165
- 164
- 163
- 162
- 161
- 160
- 159
- 158
- 157
- 156
- 155
- 154
- 153
- 152
- 151
- 150
- 149
- 148
- 147
- 146
- 145
- 144
- 143
- 142
- 141
- 140
- 139
- 138
- 137
- 136
- 135
- 134
- 133
- 132
- 131
- 130
- 129
- 128
- 127
- 126
- 125
- 124
- 123
- 122
- 121
- 120
- 119
- 118
- 117
- 116
- 115
- 114
- 113
- 112
- 111
- 110
- 109
- 108
- 107
- 106
- 105
- 104
- 103
- 102
- 101

=== 1st century BC ===
- 100
- 99
- 98
- 97
- 96
- 95
- 94
- 93
- 92
- 91
- 90
- 89
- 88
- 87
- 86
- 85
- 84
- 83
- 82
- 81
- 80
- 79
- 78
- 77
- 76
- 75
- 74
- 73
- 72
- 71
- 70
- 69
- 68
- 67
- 66
- 65
- 64
- 63
- 62
- 61
- 60
- 59
- 58
- 57
- 56
- 55
- 54
- 53
- 52
- 51
- 50
- 49
- 48
- 47
- 46
- 45
- 44
- 43
- 42
- 41
- 40
- 39
- 38
- 37
- 36
- 35
- 34
- 33
- 32
- 31
- 30
- 29
- 28
- 27
- 26
- 25
- 24
- 23
- 22
- 21
- 20
- 19
- 18
- 17
- 16
- 15
- 14
- 13
- 12
- 11
- 10
- 9
- 8
- 7
- 6
- 5
- 4
- 3
- 2
- 1

== 1st millennium ==
=== 1st century ===
- 1
- 2
- 3
- 4
- 5
- 6
- 7
- 8
- 9
- 10
- 11
- 12
- 13
- 14
- 15
- 16
- 17
- 18
- 19
- 20
- 21
- 22
- 23
- 24
- 25
- 26
- 27
- 28
- 29
- 30
- 31
- 32
- 33
- 34
- 35
- 36
- 37
- 38
- 39
- 40
- 41
- 42
- 43
- 44
- 45
- 46
- 47
- 48
- 49
- 50
- 51
- 52
- 53
- 54
- 55
- 56
- 57
- 58
- 59
- 60
- 61
- 62
- 63
- 64
- 65
- 66
- 67
- 68
- 69
- 70
- 71
- 72
- 73
- 74
- 75
- 76
- 77
- 78
- 79
- 80
- 81
- 82
- 83
- 84
- 85
- 86
- 87
- 88
- 89
- 90
- 91
- 92
- 93
- 94
- 95
- 96
- 97
- 98
- 99
- 100

=== 2nd century ===
- 101
- 102
- 103
- 104
- 105
- 106
- 107
- 108
- 109
- 110
- 111
- 112
- 113
- 114
- 115
- 116
- 117
- 118
- 119
- 120
- 121
- 122
- 123
- 124
- 125
- 126
- 127
- 128
- 129
- 130
- 131
- 132
- 133
- 134
- 135
- 136
- 137
- 138
- 139
- 140
- 141
- 142
- 143
- 144
- 145
- 146
- 147
- 148
- 149
- 150
- 151
- 152
- 153
- 154
- 155
- 156
- 157
- 158
- 159
- 160
- 161
- 162
- 163
- 164
- 165
- 166
- 167
- 168
- 169
- 170
- 171
- 172
- 173
- 174
- 175
- 176
- 177
- 178
- 179
- 180
- 181
- 182
- 183
- 184
- 185
- 186
- 187
- 188
- 189
- 190
- 191
- 192
- 193
- 194
- 195
- 196
- 197
- 198
- 199
- 200

=== 3rd century ===
- 201
- 202
- 203
- 204
- 205
- 206
- 207
- 208
- 209
- 210
- 211
- 212
- 213
- 214
- 215
- 216
- 217
- 218
- 219
- 220
- 221
- 222
- 223
- 224
- 225
- 226
- 227
- 228
- 229
- 230
- 231
- 232
- 233
- 234
- 235
- 236
- 237
- 238
- 239
- 240
- 241
- 242
- 243
- 244
- 245
- 246
- 247
- 248
- 249
- 250
- 251
- 252
- 253
- 254
- 255
- 256
- 257
- 258
- 259
- 260
- 261
- 262
- 263
- 264
- 265
- 266
- 267
- 268
- 269
- 270
- 271
- 272
- 273
- 274
- 275
- 276
- 277
- 278
- 279
- 280
- 281
- 282
- 283
- 284
- 285
- 286
- 287
- 288
- 289
- 290
- 291
- 292
- 293
- 294
- 295
- 296
- 297
- 298
- 299
- 300

=== 4th century ===
- 301
- 302
- 303
- 304
- 305
- 306
- 307
- 308
- 309
- 310
- 311
- 312
- 313
- 314
- 315
- 316
- 317
- 318
- 319
- 320
- 321
- 322
- 323
- 324
- 325
- 326
- 327
- 328
- 329
- 330
- 331
- 332
- 333
- 334
- 335
- 336
- 337
- 338
- 339
- 340
- 341
- 342
- 343
- 344
- 345
- 346
- 347
- 348
- 349
- 350
- 351
- 352
- 353
- 354
- 355
- 356
- 357
- 358
- 359
- 360
- 361
- 362
- 363
- 364
- 365
- 366
- 367
- 368
- 369
- 370
- 371
- 372
- 373
- 374
- 375
- 376
- 377
- 378
- 379
- 380
- 381
- 382
- 383
- 384
- 385
- 386
- 387
- 388
- 389
- 390
- 391
- 392
- 393
- 394
- 395
- 396
- 397
- 398
- 399
- 400

=== 5th century ===
- 401
- 402
- 403
- 404
- 405
- 406
- 407
- 408
- 409
- 410
- 411
- 412
- 413
- 414
- 415
- 416
- 417
- 418
- 419
- 420
- 421
- 422
- 423
- 424
- 425
- 426
- 427
- 428
- 429
- 430
- 431
- 432
- 433
- 434
- 435
- 436
- 437
- 438
- 439
- 440
- 441
- 442
- 443
- 444
- 445
- 446
- 447
- 448
- 449
- 450
- 451
- 452
- 453
- 454
- 455
- 456
- 457
- 458
- 459
- 460
- 461
- 462
- 463
- 464
- 465
- 466
- 467
- 468
- 469
- 470
- 471
- 472
- 473
- 474
- 475
- 476
- 477
- 478
- 479
- 480
- 481
- 482
- 483
- 484
- 485
- 486
- 487
- 488
- 489
- 490
- 491
- 492
- 493
- 494
- 495
- 496
- 497
- 498
- 499
- 500

=== 6th century ===
- 501
- 502
- 503
- 504
- 505
- 506
- 507
- 508
- 509
- 510
- 511
- 512
- 513
- 514
- 515
- 516
- 517
- 518
- 519
- 520
- 521
- 522
- 523
- 524
- 525
- 526
- 527
- 528
- 529
- 530
- 531
- 532
- 533
- 534
- 535
- 536
- 537
- 538
- 539
- 540
- 541
- 542
- 543
- 544
- 545
- 546
- 547
- 548
- 549
- 550
- 551
- 552
- 553
- 554
- 555
- 556
- 557
- 558
- 559
- 560
- 561
- 562
- 563
- 564
- 565
- 566
- 567
- 568
- 569
- 570
- 571
- 572
- 573
- 574
- 575
- 576
- 577
- 578
- 579
- 580
- 581
- 582
- 583
- 584
- 585
- 586
- 587
- 588
- 589
- 590
- 591
- 592
- 593
- 594
- 595
- 596
- 597
- 598
- 599
- 600

=== 7th century ===
- 601
- 602
- 603
- 604
- 605
- 606
- 607
- 608
- 609
- 610
- 611
- 612
- 613
- 614
- 615
- 616
- 617
- 618
- 619
- 620
- 621
- 622
- 623
- 624
- 625
- 626
- 627
- 628
- 629
- 630
- 631
- 632
- 633
- 634
- 635
- 636
- 637
- 638
- 639
- 640
- 641
- 642
- 643
- 644
- 645
- 646
- 647
- 648
- 649
- 650
- 651
- 652
- 653
- 654
- 655
- 656
- 657
- 658
- 659
- 660
- 661
- 662
- 663
- 664
- 665
- 666
- 667
- 668
- 669
- 670
- 671
- 672
- 673
- 674
- 675
- 676
- 677
- 678
- 679
- 680
- 681
- 682
- 683
- 684
- 685
- 686
- 687
- 688
- 689
- 690
- 691
- 692
- 693
- 694
- 695
- 696
- 697
- 698
- 699
- 700

=== 8th century ===
- 701
- 702
- 703
- 704
- 705
- 706
- 707
- 708
- 709
- 710
- 711
- 712
- 713
- 714
- 715
- 716
- 717
- 718
- 719
- 720
- 721
- 722
- 723
- 724
- 725
- 726
- 727
- 728
- 729
- 730
- 731
- 732
- 733
- 734
- 735
- 736
- 737
- 738
- 739
- 740
- 741
- 742
- 743
- 744
- 745
- 746
- 747
- 748
- 749
- 750
- 751
- 752
- 753
- 754
- 755
- 756
- 757
- 758
- 759
- 760
- 761
- 762
- 763
- 764
- 765
- 766
- 767
- 768
- 769
- 770
- 771
- 772
- 773
- 774
- 775
- 776
- 777
- 778
- 779
- 780
- 781
- 782
- 783
- 784
- 785
- 786
- 787
- 788
- 789
- 790
- 791
- 792
- 793
- 794
- 795
- 796
- 797
- 798
- 799
- 800

=== 9th century ===
- 801
- 802
- 803
- 804
- 805
- 806
- 807
- 808
- 809
- 810
- 811
- 812
- 813
- 814
- 815
- 816
- 817
- 818
- 819
- 820
- 821
- 822
- 823
- 824
- 825
- 826
- 827
- 828
- 829
- 830
- 831
- 832
- 833
- 834
- 835
- 836
- 837
- 838
- 839
- 840
- 841
- 842
- 843
- 844
- 845
- 846
- 847
- 848
- 849
- 850
- 851
- 852
- 853
- 854
- 855
- 856
- 857
- 858
- 859
- 860
- 861
- 862
- 863
- 864
- 865
- 866
- 867
- 868
- 869
- 870
- 871
- 872
- 873
- 874
- 875
- 876
- 877
- 878
- 879
- 880
- 881
- 882
- 883
- 884
- 885
- 886
- 887
- 888
- 889
- 890
- 891
- 892
- 893
- 894
- 895
- 896
- 897
- 898
- 899
- 900

=== 10th century ===
- 901
- 902
- 903
- 904
- 905
- 906
- 907
- 908
- 909
- 910
- 911
- 912
- 913
- 914
- 915
- 916
- 917
- 918
- 919
- 920
- 921
- 922
- 923
- 924
- 925
- 926
- 927
- 928
- 929
- 930
- 931
- 932
- 933
- 934
- 935
- 936
- 937
- 938
- 939
- 940
- 941
- 942
- 943
- 944
- 945
- 946
- 947
- 948
- 949
- 950
- 951
- 952
- 953
- 954
- 955
- 956
- 957
- 958
- 959
- 960
- 961
- 962
- 963
- 964
- 965
- 966
- 967
- 968
- 969
- 970
- 971
- 972
- 973
- 974
- 975
- 976
- 977
- 978
- 979
- 980
- 981
- 982
- 983
- 984
- 985
- 986
- 987
- 988
- 989
- 990
- 991
- 992
- 993
- 994
- 995
- 996
- 997
- 998
- 999
- 1000

== 2nd millennium ==
=== 11th century ===
- 1001
- 1002
- 1003
- 1004
- 1005
- 1006
- 1007
- 1008
- 1009
- 1010
- 1011
- 1012
- 1013
- 1014
- 1015
- 1016
- 1017
- 1018
- 1019
- 1020
- 1021
- 1022
- 1023
- 1024
- 1025
- 1026
- 1027
- 1028
- 1029
- 1030
- 1031
- 1032
- 1033
- 1034
- 1035
- 1036
- 1037
- 1038
- 1039
- 1040
- 1041
- 1042
- 1043
- 1044
- 1045
- 1046
- 1047
- 1048
- 1049
- 1050
- 1051
- 1052
- 1053
- 1054
- 1055
- 1056
- 1057
- 1058
- 1059
- 1060
- 1061
- 1062
- 1063
- 1064
- 1065
- 1066
- 1067
- 1068
- 1069
- 1070
- 1071
- 1072
- 1073
- 1074
- 1075
- 1076
- 1077
- 1078
- 1079
- 1080
- 1081
- 1082
- 1083
- 1084
- 1085
- 1086
- 1087
- 1088
- 1089
- 1090
- 1091
- 1092
- 1093
- 1094
- 1095
- 1096
- 1097
- 1098
- 1099
- 1100

=== 12th century ===
- 1101
- 1102
- 1103
- 1104
- 1105
- 1106
- 1107
- 1108
- 1109
- 1110
- 1111
- 1112
- 1113
- 1114
- 1115
- 1116
- 1117
- 1118
- 1119
- 1120
- 1121
- 1122
- 1123
- 1124
- 1125
- 1126
- 1127
- 1128
- 1129
- 1130
- 1131
- 1132
- 1133
- 1134
- 1135
- 1136
- 1137
- 1138
- 1139
- 1140
- 1141
- 1142
- 1143
- 1144
- 1145
- 1146
- 1147
- 1148
- 1149
- 1150
- 1151
- 1152
- 1153
- 1154
- 1155
- 1156
- 1157
- 1158
- 1159
- 1160
- 1161
- 1162
- 1163
- 1164
- 1165
- 1166
- 1167
- 1168
- 1169
- 1170
- 1171
- 1172
- 1173
- 1174
- 1175
- 1176
- 1177
- 1178
- 1179
- 1180
- 1181
- 1182
- 1183
- 1184
- 1185
- 1186
- 1187
- 1188
- 1189
- 1190
- 1191
- 1192
- 1193
- 1194
- 1195
- 1196
- 1197
- 1198
- 1199
- 1200

=== 13th century ===
- 1201
- 1202
- 1203
- 1204
- 1205
- 1206
- 1207
- 1208
- 1209
- 1210
- 1211
- 1212
- 1213
- 1214
- 1215
- 1216
- 1217
- 1218
- 1219
- 1220
- 1221
- 1222
- 1223
- 1224
- 1225
- 1226
- 1227
- 1228
- 1229
- 1230
- 1231
- 1232
- 1233
- 1234
- 1235
- 1236
- 1237
- 1238
- 1239
- 1240
- 1241
- 1242
- 1243
- 1244
- 1245
- 1246
- 1247
- 1248
- 1249
- 1250
- 1251
- 1252
- 1253
- 1254
- 1255
- 1256
- 1257
- 1258
- 1259
- 1260
- 1261
- 1262
- 1263
- 1264
- 1265
- 1266
- 1267
- 1268
- 1269
- 1270
- 1271
- 1272
- 1273
- 1274
- 1275
- 1276
- 1277
- 1278
- 1279
- 1280
- 1281
- 1282
- 1283
- 1284
- 1285
- 1286
- 1287
- 1288
- 1289
- 1290
- 1291
- 1292
- 1293
- 1294
- 1295
- 1296
- 1297
- 1298
- 1299
- 1300

=== 14th century ===
- 1301
- 1302
- 1303
- 1304
- 1305
- 1306
- 1307
- 1308
- 1309
- 1310
- 1311
- 1312
- 1313
- 1314
- 1315
- 1316
- 1317
- 1318
- 1319
- 1320
- 1321
- 1322
- 1323
- 1324
- 1325
- 1326
- 1327
- 1328
- 1329
- 1330
- 1331
- 1332
- 1333
- 1334
- 1335
- 1336
- 1337
- 1338
- 1339
- 1340
- 1341
- 1342
- 1343
- 1344
- 1345
- 1346
- 1347
- 1348
- 1349
- 1350
- 1351
- 1352
- 1353
- 1354
- 1355
- 1356
- 1357
- 1358
- 1359
- 1360
- 1361
- 1362
- 1363
- 1364
- 1365
- 1366
- 1367
- 1368
- 1369
- 1370
- 1371
- 1372
- 1373
- 1374
- 1375
- 1376
- 1377
- 1378
- 1379
- 1380
- 1381
- 1382
- 1383
- 1384
- 1385
- 1386
- 1387
- 1388
- 1389
- 1390
- 1391
- 1392
- 1393
- 1394
- 1395
- 1396
- 1397
- 1398
- 1399
- 1400

=== 15th century ===
- 1401
- 1402
- 1403
- 1404
- 1405
- 1406
- 1407
- 1408
- 1409
- 1410
- 1411
- 1412
- 1413
- 1414
- 1415
- 1416
- 1417
- 1418
- 1419
- 1420
- 1421
- 1422
- 1423
- 1424
- 1425
- 1426
- 1427
- 1428
- 1429
- 1430
- 1431
- 1432
- 1433
- 1434
- 1435
- 1436
- 1437
- 1438
- 1439
- 1440
- 1441
- 1442
- 1443
- 1444
- 1445
- 1446
- 1447
- 1448
- 1449
- 1450
- 1451
- 1452
- 1453
- 1454
- 1455
- 1456
- 1457
- 1458
- 1459
- 1460
- 1461
- 1462
- 1463
- 1464
- 1465
- 1466
- 1467
- 1468
- 1469
- 1470
- 1471
- 1472
- 1473
- 1474
- 1475
- 1476
- 1477
- 1478
- 1479
- 1480
- 1481
- 1482
- 1483
- 1484
- 1485
- 1486
- 1487
- 1488
- 1489
- 1490
- 1491
- 1492
- 1493
- 1494
- 1495
- 1496
- 1497
- 1498
- 1499
- 1500

=== 16th century ===
- 1501
- 1502
- 1503
- 1504
- 1505
- 1506
- 1507
- 1508
- 1509
- 1510
- 1511
- 1512
- 1513
- 1514
- 1515
- 1516
- 1517
- 1518
- 1519
- 1520
- 1521
- 1522
- 1523
- 1524
- 1525
- 1526
- 1527
- 1528
- 1529
- 1530
- 1531
- 1532
- 1533
- 1534
- 1535
- 1536
- 1537
- 1538
- 1539
- 1540
- 1541
- 1542
- 1543
- 1544
- 1545
- 1546
- 1547
- 1548
- 1549
- 1550
- 1551
- 1552
- 1553
- 1554
- 1555
- 1556
- 1557
- 1558
- 1559
- 1560
- 1561
- 1562
- 1563
- 1564
- 1565
- 1566
- 1567
- 1568
- 1569
- 1570
- 1571
- 1572
- 1573
- 1574
- 1575
- 1576
- 1577
- 1578
- 1579
- 1580
- 1581
- 1582
- 1583
- 1584
- 1585
- 1586
- 1587
- 1588
- 1589
- 1590
- 1591
- 1592
- 1593
- 1594
- 1595
- 1596
- 1597
- 1598
- 1599
- 1600

=== 17th century ===
- 1601
- 1602
- 1603
- 1604
- 1605
- 1606
- 1607
- 1608
- 1609
- 1610
- 1611
- 1612
- 1613
- 1614
- 1615
- 1616
- 1617
- 1618
- 1619
- 1620
- 1621
- 1622
- 1623
- 1624
- 1625
- 1626
- 1627
- 1628
- 1629
- 1630
- 1631
- 1632
- 1633
- 1634
- 1635
- 1636
- 1637
- 1638
- 1639
- 1640
- 1641
- 1642
- 1643
- 1644
- 1645
- 1646
- 1647
- 1648
- 1649
- 1650
- 1651
- 1652
- 1653
- 1654
- 1655
- 1656
- 1657
- 1658
- 1659
- 1660
- 1661
- 1662
- 1663
- 1664
- 1665
- 1666
- 1667
- 1668
- 1669
- 1670
- 1671
- 1672
- 1673
- 1674
- 1675
- 1676
- 1677
- 1678
- 1679
- 1680
- 1681
- 1682
- 1683
- 1684
- 1685
- 1686
- 1687
- 1688
- 1689
- 1690
- 1691
- 1692
- 1693
- 1694
- 1695
- 1696
- 1697
- 1698
- 1699
- 1700

=== 18th century ===
- 1701
- 1702
- 1703
- 1704
- 1705
- 1706
- 1707
- 1708
- 1709
- 1710
- 1711
- 1712
- 1713
- 1714
- 1715
- 1716
- 1717
- 1718
- 1719
- 1720
- 1721
- 1722
- 1723
- 1724
- 1725
- 1726
- 1727
- 1728
- 1729
- 1730
- 1731
- 1732
- 1733
- 1734
- 1735
- 1736
- 1737
- 1738
- 1739
- 1740
- 1741
- 1742
- 1743
- 1744
- 1745
- 1746
- 1747
- 1748
- 1749
- 1750
- 1751
- 1752
- 1753
- 1754
- 1755
- 1756
- 1757
- 1758
- 1759
- 1760
- 1761
- 1762
- 1763
- 1764
- 1765
- 1766
- 1767
- 1768
- 1769
- 1770
- 1771
- 1772
- 1773
- 1774
- 1775
- 1776
- 1777
- 1778
- 1779
- 1780
- 1781
- 1782
- 1783
- 1784
- 1785
- 1786
- 1787
- 1788
- 1789
- 1790
- 1791
- 1792
- 1793
- 1794
- 1795
- 1796
- 1797
- 1798
- 1799
- 1800

=== 19th century ===
- 1801
- 1802
- 1803
- 1804
- 1805
- 1806
- 1807
- 1808
- 1809
- 1810
- 1811
- 1812
- 1813
- 1814
- 1815
- 1816
- 1817
- 1818
- 1819
- 1820
- 1821
- 1822
- 1823
- 1824
- 1825
- 1826
- 1827
- 1828
- 1829
- 1830
- 1831
- 1832
- 1833
- 1834
- 1835
- 1836
- 1837
- 1838
- 1839
- 1840
- 1841
- 1842
- 1843
- 1844
- 1845
- 1846
- 1847
- 1848
- 1849
- 1850
- 1851
- 1852
- 1853
- 1854
- 1855
- 1856
- 1857
- 1858
- 1859
- 1860
- 1861
- 1862
- 1863
- 1864
- 1865
- 1866
- 1867
- 1868
- 1869
- 1870
- 1871
- 1872
- 1873
- 1874
- 1875
- 1876
- 1877
- 1878
- 1879
- 1880
- 1881
- 1882
- 1883
- 1884
- 1885
- 1886
- 1887
- 1888
- 1889
- 1890
- 1891
- 1892
- 1893
- 1894
- 1895
- 1896
- 1897
- 1898
- 1899
- 1900

=== 20th century ===
- 1901
- 1902
- 1903
- 1904
- 1905
- 1906
- 1907
- 1908
- 1909
- 1910
- 1911
- 1912
- 1913
- 1914
- 1915
- 1916
- 1917
- 1918
- 1919
- 1920
- 1921
- 1922
- 1923
- 1924
- 1925
- 1926
- 1927
- 1928
- 1929
- 1930
- 1931
- 1932
- 1933
- 1934
- 1935
- 1936
- 1937
- 1938
- 1939
- 1940
- 1941
- 1942
- 1943
- 1944
- 1945
- 1946
- 1947
- 1948
- 1949
- 1950
- 1951
- 1952
- 1953
- 1954
- 1955
- 1956
- 1957
- 1958
- 1959
- 1960
- 1961
- 1962
- 1963
- 1964
- 1965
- 1966
- 1967
- 1968
- 1969
- 1970
- 1971
- 1972
- 1973
- 1974
- 1975
- 1976
- 1977
- 1978
- 1979
- 1980
- 1981
- 1982
- 1983
- 1984
- 1985
- 1986
- 1987
- 1988
- 1989
- 1990
- 1991
- 1992
- 1993
- 1994
- 1995
- 1996
- 1997
- 1998
- 1999
- 2000

== 3rd millennium ==
=== 21st century ===
- 2001
- 2002
- 2003
- 2004
- 2005
- 2006
- 2007
- 2008
- 2009
- 2010
- 2011
- 2012
- 2013
- 2014
- 2015
- 2016
- 2017
- 2018
- 2019
- 2020
- 2021
- 2022
- 2023
- 2024
- 2025
- 2026
- 2027
- 2028
- 2029
- 2030
- 2031
- 2032
- 2033
- 2034
- 2035
- 2036
- 2037
- 2038
- 2039
- 2040
- 2041
- 2042
- 2043
- 2044
- 2045
- 2046
- 2047
- 2048
- 2049
- 2050

== See also ==
- List of decades, centuries, and millennia
- Lists of years by topic
- Timeline of the far future
- Year zero
