= 180s BC =

Decade

This article concerns the period 189 BC – 180 BC.

== Births ==
188 BC

- Jing of Han, emperor of the Chinese Han dynasty, who ruled from 157 BC (d. 141 BC)

187 BC

- Demetrius I Soter, king of Syria (approximate year)

186 BC

- Ptolemy VI Philometor, king of Egypt, who will reign from 180 BC (d. 145 BC)

185 BC

- Panaetius of Rhodes, Greek philosopher (d. 110 BC)
- Publius Cornelius Scipio Aemilianus, leading general and politician of the Roman Republic. As consul he will be the commander of the final siege and destruction of Carthage and will be the leader of the senators opposed to the Gracchi (d. 129 BC)

184 BC

- Liu Wu, Chinese prince of the Han dynasty (approximate date)

183 BC

- Publius Cornelius Scipio Nasica Serapio, consul in 138 BC, who will have a prominent part in the murder of Tiberius Gracchus by leading a group of conservative senators and other knights in opposition to Gracchus and his supporters (d. 132 BC).

182 BC

- Ptolemy VIII Euergetes II, king of the Ptolemaic dynasty in Egypt (d. 116 BC)

180 BC

- Apollodorus of Athens, Greek scholar and grammarian (d. c. 120 BC)
- Decimus Junius Brutus Callaicus, Roman consul (d. 113 BC)
- Viriathus, Lusitanian chieftain and general (d. 139 BC)

== Deaths ==
189 BC

- Fan Kuai, Chinese general and politician of the Han dynasty (during the Chu-Han Contention)
- Liu Fei, Chinese prince and proclaimed king of the former Qi State (Zhou dynasty) (b. 221 BC)
- Zhang Liang, Chinese rebel and taoist, who has helped Liu Bang establish the Han dynasty (b. 262 BC)

188 BC

- Hui of Han, the second emperor of the Chinese Han dynasty, who ruled from 195 BC (b. 210 BC)

187 BC

- Antiochus III the Great, Seleucid king of the Hellenistic Syrian Empire from 223 BC (b. c. 241 BC)

186 BC

- Li Cang, Marquis of Dai, buried in one of the Mawangdui

185 BC

- Brhadrata, Indian emperor, last ruler of the Indian Mauryan dynasty (from 197 BC)

184 BC

- Liu Gong, Chinese emperor of the Han dynasty (b. 193 BC)
- Titus Macchius Plautus, Roman comic dramatist, whose works, loosely adapted from Greek plays, established a truly Roman drama in the Latin language (b. c. 254 BC)

183 BC

- Publius Cornelius Scipio Africanus Major, Roman statesman and general, famous for his victory over the Carthaginian leader Hannibal in the Battle of Zama in 202 BC, which ended the Second Punic War and gave him the surname Africanus (b. 236 BC)
- Philopoemen, Greek general and statesman, strategos of the Achaean League on eight occasions and a major figure in the demise of Sparta as a Greek power (b. 253 BC)
- Hannibal, Carthaginian statesman, military commander and tactician, one of history's great military leaders, who has commanded the Carthaginian forces against Rome in the Second Punic War (b. 247 BC)

182 BC

- Prusias I Chlorus, king of Bithynia (b. c. 228 BC)

180 BC

- August 18 – Empress Dowager Lü, de facto ruler of the Chinese Han dynasty and wife of Emperor Gao (b. 241 BC)
- Aristophanes of Byzantium, Greek scholar, critic and grammarian, particularly renowned for his work in Homeric scholarship, but also for work on other classical authors such as Pindar and Hesiod. After early studies under leading scholars in Alexandria, he has been chief librarian since about 195 BC (b. 257 BC)
- Liu Hong, fourth emperor of the Chinese Han dynasty (b. 190 BC)
- Lucius Valerius Flaccus, Roman statesman, consul in 195 BC, censor in 183 BC and colleague of Cato the Elder
- Ptolemy V Epiphanes, king of Egypt (b. 210 BC)
