= 175 BC =

175 BC in various calendars
- Gregorian calendar: 175 BC; CLXXV BC
- Ab urbe condita: 579
- Ancient Egypt era: XXXIII dynasty, 149
- Pharaoh: Ptolemy VI Philometor, 6
- Ancient Greek Olympiad (summer): 151st Olympiad, year 2
- Assyrian calendar: 4576
- Balinese saka calendar: N/A
- Bengali calendar: −768 – −767
- Berber calendar: 776
- Buddhist calendar: 370
- Burmese calendar: −812
- Byzantine calendar: 5334–5335
- Chinese calendar: 乙丑年 (Wood Ox); 2523 or 2316 — to — 丙寅年 (Fire Tiger); 2524 or 2317
- Coptic calendar: −458 – −457
- Discordian calendar: 992
- Ethiopian calendar: −182 – −181
- Hebrew calendar: 3586–3587
- Hindu calendars
- Vikram Samvat: −118 – −117
- Shaka Samvat: N/A
- Kali Yuga: 2926–2927
- Holocene calendar: 9826
- Iranian calendar: 796 BP – 795 BP
- Islamic calendar: 820 BH – 819 BH
- Javanese calendar: N/A
- Julian calendar: N/A
- Korean calendar: 2159
- Minguo calendar: 2086 before ROC 民前2086年
- Nanakshahi calendar: −1642
- Seleucid era: 137/138 AG
- Thai solar calendar: 368–369
- Tibetan calendar: ཤིང་མོ་གླང་ལོ་ (female Wood-Ox) −48 or −429 or −1201 — to — མེ་ཕོ་སྟག་ལོ་ (male Fire-Tiger) −47 or −428 or −1200

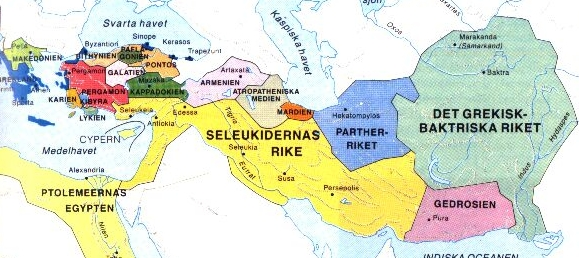
The Middle East in 175 BC (Swedish captions)

Year 175 BC was a year of the pre-Julian Roman calendar. At the time it was known as the Year of the Consulship of Scaevola and Lepidus (or, less frequently, year 579 Ab urbe condita). The denomination 175 BC for this year has been used since the early medieval period, when the Anno Domini calendar era became the prevalent method in Europe for naming years.

== Events ==
=== By place ===
==== Seleucid Empire ====
- King Seleucus IV of Syria arranges for the exchange of his brother Antiochus for Demetrius, the son of Seleucus IV, who has been a hostage in Rome following the Treaty of Apamea in 188 BC. However, Seleucus IV is assassinated by his chief minister Heliodorus, who then seizes the Syrian throne.
- Antiochus manages to oust Heliodorus and takes advantage of Demetrius' captivity in Rome to seize the throne for himself under the name Antiochus IV Epiphanes.
- During this period of uncertainty in Syria, the Egyptian ruler, Ptolemy VI, lays claim to Coele Syria, Palestine, and Phoenicia, which the Seleucid king Antiochus III has previously conquered. Both the Syrian and Egyptian parties appeal to Rome for help, but the Roman Senate refuses to take sides.
- Timarchus is appointed governor of Media in western Persia by Antiochus IV to deal with the growing threat from the Parthians. At the same time, Timarchus' brother, Heracleides, becomes minister of the royal finances.

==== Ireland ====
- Latest murder date for Old Croghan Man.

=== By topic ===
==== Art ====
- The construction of the western front of the altar in Pergamum, Turkey, begins (approximate date) and is finished in 156 BC. A reconstruction of it is now kept at the Pergamon Museum in Berlin.

== Deaths ==
- Quintus Caecilius Metellus, Roman consul and dictator (b. c. 250 BC)
- Seleucus IV Philopator, king of the Seleucid dynasty, who has ruled since 187 BC (b. c. 217 BC)
- Cleopatra I of Egypt, mother of Ptolemy VI.
