= 226 (disambiguation) =

226 may refer to:

- 226 (year)
- 226 (number)
- 226 BC
- 2-26 Incident
- UFC 226
- 226 Weringia
- Area code 226
