= 141 =

141 may refer to:

- 141 (number), the natural number following 140 and preceding 142
- AD 141, a year of the Julian calendar
- 141 BC, a year of the pre-Julian Roman calendar
- 141 Lumen, a main-belt asteroid
- Lockheed C-141 Starlifter, a retired American military aircraft
