= 242 BC =

242 BC in various calendars
Gregorian calendar	242 BC; CCXLII BC
Ab urbe condita	512
Ancient Egypt era	XXXIII dynasty, 82
Pharaoh	Ptolemy III Euergetes, 5
Ancient Greek Olympiad (summer)	134th Olympiad, year 3
Assyrian calendar	4509
Balinese saka calendar	N/A
Bengali calendar	−835 – −834
Berber calendar	709
Buddhist calendar	303
Burmese calendar	−879
Byzantine calendar	5267–5268
Chinese calendar	戊午年 (Earth Horse); 2456 or 2249 — to — 己未年 (Earth Goat); 2457 or 2250
Coptic calendar	−525 – −524
Discordian calendar	925
Ethiopian calendar	−249 – −248
Hebrew calendar	3519–3520
- Hindu calendars
Vikram Samvat	−185 – −184
Shaka Samvat	N/A
Kali Yuga	2859–2860
Holocene calendar	9759
Iranian calendar	863 BP – 862 BP
Islamic calendar	890 BH – 889 BH
Javanese calendar	N/A
Julian calendar	N/A
Korean calendar	2092
Minguo calendar	2153 before ROC 民前2153年
Nanakshahi calendar	−1709
Seleucid era	70/71 AG
Thai solar calendar	301–302
Tibetan calendar	阳土马年 (male Earth-Horse) −115 or −496 or −1268 — to — 阴土羊年 (female Earth-Goat) −114 or −495 or −1267

Year 242 BC was a year of the pre-Julian Roman calendar. At the time it was known as the Year of the Consulship of Catulus and Albinus (or, less frequently, year 512 Ab urbe condita). The denomination 242 BC for this year has been used since the early medieval period, when the Anno Domini calendar era became the prevalent method in Europe for naming years.

== Events ==
=== By place ===
==== Roman Republic ====
- The Roman consul and commander, Gaius Lutatius Catulus, blockades the Sicilian cities of Lilybaeum and Drepanum with a fleet of 200 ships.

==== Egypt ====
- The destruction of the Egyptian fleet by the Macedonians ends the naval supremacy of the Ptolemies but does not force them to relinquish their territories in Syria and the Aegean Sea.

==== China ====
- The Qin general Meng Ao annexes 20 towns and cities from the State of Wei, conquering the cities of Suanzao, Yan, Xu, Changping, Yongqiu and Shanyang. He then establishes the Dongjun Commandery.
- The Zhao general Pang Nuan defeats the army of the State of Yan and kills its general Chu Xin.

== Births ==
- Antiochus III the Great, Seleucid king of Hellenistic Syria (d. 187 BC)

== Deaths ==
- Maharani Devi, Mauryan empress and wife of Ashoka (approximate date)
