= 541 (disambiguation) =

541 may refer to:

- 541 AD, a year
- 541 BC
- 541 (number)
- Area code 541, a North American telephone area code in Oregon
