= 351 BC =

351 BC in various calendars
| Gregorian calendar | 351 BC; CCCLI BC |
| Ab urbe condita | 403 |
| Ancient Egypt era | XXX dynasty, 30 |
| Pharaoh | Nectanebo II, 10 |
| Ancient Greek Olympiad (summer) | 107th Olympiad, year 2 |
| Assyrian calendar | 4400 |
| Balinese saka calendar | N/A |
| Bengali calendar | −944 – −943 |
| Berber calendar | 600 |
| Buddhist calendar | 194 |
| Burmese calendar | −988 |
| Byzantine calendar | 5158–5159 |
| Chinese calendar | 己巳年 (Earth Snake); 2347 or 2140 — to — 庚午年 (Metal Horse); 2348 or 2141 |
| Coptic calendar | −634 – −633 |
| Discordian calendar | 816 |
| Ethiopian calendar | −358 – −357 |
| Hebrew calendar | 3410–3411 |
- Hindu calendars
| Vikram Samvat | −294 – −293 |
| Shaka Samvat | N/A |
| Kali Yuga | 2750–2751 |
| Holocene calendar | 9650 |
| Iranian calendar | 972 BP – 971 BP |
| Islamic calendar | 1002 BH – 1001 BH |
| Javanese calendar | N/A |
| Julian calendar | N/A |
| Korean calendar | 1983 |
| Minguo calendar | 2262 before ROC 民前2262年 |
| Nanakshahi calendar | −1818 |
| Thai solar calendar | 192–193 |
| Tibetan calendar | ས་མོ་སྦྲུལ་ལོ་ (female Earth-Snake) −224 or −605 or −1377 — to — ལྕགས་ཕོ་རྟ་ལོ་ (male Iron-Horse) −223 or −604 or −1376 |

Year 351 BC was a year of the pre-Julian Roman calendar. At the time it was known as the Year of the Consulship of Peticus and Crispinus (or, less frequently, year 403 Ab urbe condita). The denomination 351 BC for this year has been used since the early medieval period, when the Anno Domini calendar era became the prevalent method in Europe for naming years.

== Events ==
=== By place ===
==== Persian Empire ====
- Encouraged by a failed effort at invasion of Egypt by King Artaxerxes III, Phoenicia and Cyprus revolt against Persia.

==== Greece ====
- Demosthenes tries to get the Athenians to cease depending on paid mercenaries and return to the old concept of a citizen army. He also delivers his First Philippic, warning Athenians of the folly of believing that Philip's ill health will save Athens from the Macedonians. In response, Athens' citizens vote for increased armaments.

==== Roman Republic ====
- The Etruscans are badly defeated by the Romans and abandon their attacks on the city and sue for peace.
- First use of the heavy throwing spear, the pilum, (according to Livy) in battle against the Gauls.
- Gaius Marcius Rutilus becomes the first Roman plebeian to be elected to the office of censor.

== Artaxerxes III and the Egyptian Revolt ==
In 351 BC, Artaxerxes III, the King of Persia, undertook a significant military campaign to reassert Persian control over Egypt, which had been in a state of revolt. The revolt was led by Nectanebo II, the last native pharaoh of Egypt's 30th Dynasty. Artaxerxes III prepared a large and well-equipped army to invade Egypt. His strategy involved not only military might but also political and diplomatic maneuvers to weaken Egyptian resistance. In 351 BC, Artaxerxes III launched his invasion. The Persians initially faced strong resistance from Nectanebo II and his forces, who utilized Egypt’s natural defenses, such as the Nile Delta's marshlands, to their advantage.

=== Outcome ===
Despite the initial successes of the Egyptian defense, the Persian forces gradually gained the upper hand. The details of the campaign are sparse, but it is known that by 343 BC, Artaxerxes III successfully subdued Egypt, marking the end of Nectanebo II’s reign and the last period of native rule until the Ptolemaic dynasty.
