= 200 BC =

200 BC in various calendars
- Gregorian calendar: 200 BC; CC BC
- Ab urbe condita: 554
- Ancient Egypt era: XXXIII dynasty, 124
- Pharaoh: Ptolemy V Epiphanes, 4
- Ancient Greek Olympiad (summer): 145th Olympiad (victor)¹
- Assyrian calendar: 4551
- Balinese saka calendar: N/A
- Bengali calendar: −793 – −792
- Berber calendar: 751
- Buddhist calendar: 345
- Burmese calendar: −837
- Byzantine calendar: 5309–5310
- Chinese calendar: 庚子年 (Metal Rat); 2498 or 2291 — to — 辛丑年 (Metal Ox); 2499 or 2292
- Coptic calendar: −483 – −482
- Discordian calendar: 967
- Ethiopian calendar: −207 – −206
- Hebrew calendar: 3561–3562
- Hindu calendars
- Vikram Samvat: −143 – −142
- Shaka Samvat: N/A
- Kali Yuga: 2901–2902
- Holocene calendar: 9801
- Iranian calendar: 821 BP – 820 BP
- Islamic calendar: 846 BH – 845 BH
- Javanese calendar: N/A
- Julian calendar: N/A
- Korean calendar: 2134
- Minguo calendar: 2111 before ROC 民前2111年
- Nanakshahi calendar: −1667
- Seleucid era: 112/113 AG
- Thai solar calendar: 343–344
- Tibetan calendar: ལྕགས་ཕོ་བྱི་བ་ལོ་ (male Iron-Rat) −73 or −454 or −1226 — to — ལྕགས་མོ་གླང་ལོ་ (female Iron-Ox) −72 or −453 or −1225

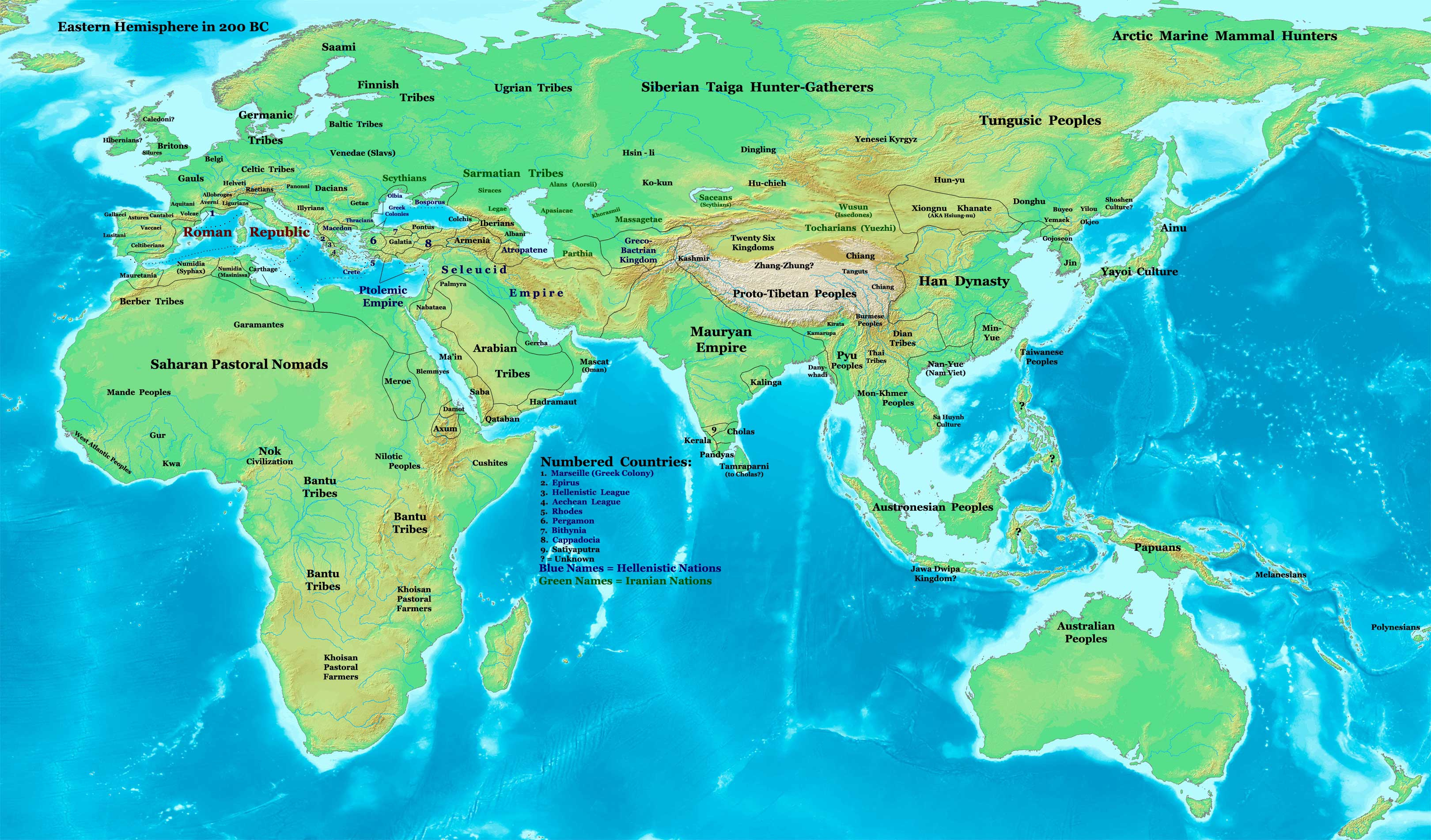
Map of the Eastern Hemisphere in 200 BC.

Year 200 BC was a year of the pre-Julian Roman calendar. At the time it was known as the Year of the Consulship of Maximus and Cotta (or, less frequently, year 554 Ab urbe condita). The denomination 200 BC for this year has been used since the early medieval period, when the Anno Domini calendar era became the prevalent method in Europe for naming years.

== Events ==
=== By place ===
==== Seleucid Empire ====
- Antiochus III's forces continue their invasion of Coele Syria and Palestine.
- Conquest of Armenia by the Seleucids.

==== Greece ====
- Philip V of Macedon's fleet defeat the Rhodians at Lade. His forces then advance into Pergamum, plundering Pergamese territory and attacking cities in Caria.
- The Acarnanians, with Macedonian support, invade Attica, causing Athens, which has previously maintained its neutrality, to seek help from the enemies of Philip. Attalus I of Pergamum, who is with his fleet at Aegina, receives an embassy from Athens asking him to come to the city for consultations. After he is told that Roman ambassadors are also in Athens, Attalus goes there in haste.
- The Roman ambassador to Greece, Syria, and Egypt, Marcus Aemilius Lepidus delivers an ultimatum to Philip V warning Macedonia not to make war on any Greek state. Philip decides to reject the Roman ultimatum and the Romans declare war on Macedon, thus starting the Second Macedonian War.
- The Roman consul, Publius Sulpicius Galba Maximus, asks Attalus I and his fleet to meet up with the Roman fleet off the Greek Aegean coast and they conduct a naval campaign against Philip V, harassing Macedonian possessions in and along the Aegean.

==== Bactria ====
- Euthydemus I of the Greco-Bactrian Kingdom dies and is succeeded by his son Demetrius I of Bactria (approximate date).

==== South America ====
- The city of Tiwanaku is founded as a village near Lake Titicaca in modern Bolivia (approximate date).
- The Early Horizon period in the Andes comes to an end as the Chavin culture vanishes and is succeeded by the Nazca culture (approximate date).

==== China ====
- Chinese create a padding material.
- The construction of the Wei-Yang Palace in the Han dynasty capital (Chang'an) begins.
- The Han emperor Gaozu is defeated by the Xiongnu, led by Modu Chanyu, in the Battle of Baideng.

=== By topic ===
==== Art ====
- Alexander the Great, head from a Hellenistic copy of a statue, possibly after a 4th century BC original by Lysippos is made. It is now kept at the Archeological Museum in Istanbul, Turkey.
- Lost-wax casting is known in China and Mesopotamia (approximate date).
- Roman artists begin attempting to produce the illusion of thin slabs of colored marble covering the walls, which are set off by actual architectural moldings and columns, in private houses. These attempts last for 120 years.

==== Astronomy ====
- The first good measurement of the distance between Earth and the Sun is made by Eratosthenes (approximate date). By studying lunar eclipses, his result is roughly 150 000 000 km. The currently accepted value is 149 597 870 691 ± 30 metres.

== In fiction ==
- This year is used as the fourth time world (Amazon Jungle) in the video game The Lost Vikings 2.
- The Tribunal in Marianne Curley's Guardians of Time Trilogy is set up near Athens.
- Young Aphrodites (an award-winning drama film about a nomadic group of shepherds) is set in 200 BC.

== Births ==
- Chao Cuo, Chinese political advisor and official (approximate date)
- Gongsun Hong, Chinese statesman and chancellor (d. 121 BC)
- Jia Yi, Chinese statesman and poet (d. 170 BC)
- Wen, Chinese emperor of the Han dynasty (d. 157 BC)

== Deaths ==
- Abdissares, king of Sophene (Armenian Kingdom) from 212 BC
- Euthydemus I, king of the Greco-Bactrian Kingdom from 223 BC (approximate date) (b. c. 260 BC)
