= 349 BC =

349 BC in various calendars
- Gregorian calendar: 349 BC; CCCXLIX BC
- Ab urbe condita: 405
- Ancient Egypt era: XXX dynasty, 32
- Pharaoh: Nectanebo II, 12
- Ancient Greek Olympiad (summer): 107th Olympiad, year 4
- Assyrian calendar: 4402
- Balinese saka calendar: N/A
- Bengali calendar: −942 – −941
- Berber calendar: 602
- Buddhist calendar: 196
- Burmese calendar: −986
- Byzantine calendar: 5160–5161
- Chinese calendar: 辛未年 (Metal Goat); 2349 or 2142 — to — 壬申年 (Water Monkey); 2350 or 2143
- Coptic calendar: −632 – −631
- Discordian calendar: 818
- Ethiopian calendar: −356 – −355
- Hebrew calendar: 3412–3413
- Hindu calendars
- Vikram Samvat: −292 – −291
- Shaka Samvat: N/A
- Kali Yuga: 2752–2753
- Holocene calendar: 9652
- Iranian calendar: 970 BP – 969 BP
- Islamic calendar: 1000 BH – 999 BH
- Javanese calendar: N/A
- Julian calendar: N/A
- Korean calendar: 1985
- Minguo calendar: 2260 before ROC 民前2260年
- Nanakshahi calendar: −1816
- Thai solar calendar: 194–195
- Tibetan calendar: ལྕགས་མོ་ལུག་ལོ་ (female Iron-Sheep) −222 or −603 or −1375 — to — ཆུ་ཕོ་སྤྲེ་ལོ་ (male Water-Monkey) −221 or −602 or −1374

Year 349 BC was a year of the pre-Julian Roman calendar. At the time it was known as the Year of the Consulship of Camillus and Crassus (or, less frequently, year 405 Ab urbe condita). The denomination 349 BC for this year has been used since the early medieval period, when the Anno Domini calendar era became the prevalent method in Europe for naming years.

== Events ==
=== By place ===
==== Persian Empire ====
- Sidon is besieged by Persian forces. The Persian Empire reasserted its dominance over Egypt after Nectanebo II was forced to flee following the Persian military campaign under Artaxerxes III. The native Egyptian rule briefly came to an end, and the Persians regained control. This was just a precursor to the later events that would lead to Alexander the Great's conquest of Egypt in the early 4th century BCE, ultimately ending Persian rule and ushering in the Hellenistic period.

==== Macedonia ====
- After recovering from illness, Philip II of Macedon turns his attention to the remaining Athenian controlled cities in Macedonia and to the city of Olynthus, in particular. The Athenians organize to send help.

== Deaths ==
- Plato
- Gorgippus
- Appius Claudius Crassus Inregillensis
