= 155 BC =

155 BC in various calendars
- Gregorian calendar: 155 BC; CLV BC
- Ab urbe condita: 599
- Ancient Egypt era: XXXIII dynasty, 169
- Pharaoh: Ptolemy VI Philometor, 26
- Ancient Greek Olympiad (summer): 156th Olympiad, year 2
- Assyrian calendar: 4596
- Balinese saka calendar: N/A
- Bengali calendar: −748 – −747
- Berber calendar: 796
- Buddhist calendar: 390
- Burmese calendar: −792
- Byzantine calendar: 5354–5355
- Chinese calendar: 乙酉年 (Wood Rooster); 2543 or 2336 — to — 丙戌年 (Fire Dog); 2544 or 2337
- Coptic calendar: −438 – −437
- Discordian calendar: 1012
- Ethiopian calendar: −162 – −161
- Hebrew calendar: 3606–3607
- Hindu calendars
- Vikram Samvat: −98 – −97
- Shaka Samvat: N/A
- Kali Yuga: 2946–2947
- Holocene calendar: 9846
- Iranian calendar: 776 BP – 775 BP
- Islamic calendar: 800 BH – 799 BH
- Javanese calendar: N/A
- Julian calendar: N/A
- Korean calendar: 2179
- Minguo calendar: 2066 before ROC 民前2066年
- Nanakshahi calendar: −1622
- Seleucid era: 157/158 AG
- Thai solar calendar: 388–389
- Tibetan calendar: ཤིང་མོ་བྱ་ལོ་ (female Wood-Bird) −28 or −409 or −1181 — to — མེ་ཕོ་ཁྱི་ལོ་ (male Fire-Dog) −27 or −408 or −1180

Year 155 BC was a year of the pre-Julian Roman calendar. At the time it was known as the Year of the Consulship of Corculum and Marcellus (or, less frequently, year 599 Ab urbe condita). The denomination 155 BC for this year has been used since the early medieval period, when the Anno Domini calendar era became the prevalent method in Europe for naming years.

== Events ==
=== By place ===
==== Hispania ====
- Under the command of Punicus and then Caesarus, the Lusitani, a Hispanic tribe, reach a point near modern day Gibraltar. Here they are defeated by the Roman praetor Lucius Mummius.

==== Roman Republic ====
- As part of the Roman efforts to fully conquer and occupy the whole of Illyria, a Roman army under consul Publius Cornelius Scipio Nasica Corculum attacks the Dalmatians for the first time and conquers the Dalmatian capital of Delminium. As a result, the Dalmatians are compelled to pay tribute to Rome, which puts an end to the first Dalmatian war. In recognition of his victory, Corculum is granted a triumph in Rome.

==== Bactria ====
- Menander I (known as Milinda in Sanskrit and Pali) begins his reign as king of the Indo-Greek Kingdom. His territories cover the eastern dominions of the divided Greek empire of Bactria (Panjshir and Kapisa) and extend to the modern Pakistani province of Punjab, most of the Indian states of Punjab and Himachal Pradesh and the Jammu region. His capital is considered to have been Sagala, a prosperous city in northern Punjab believed to be modern Sialkot.

== Deaths ==
- Empress Dowager Bo, imperial concubine of Emperor Gao of the Han dynasty.
