= 243 BC =

243 BC in various calendars
- Gregorian calendar: 243 BC; CCXLIII BC
- Ab urbe condita: 511
- Ancient Egypt era: XXXIII dynasty, 81
- Pharaoh: Ptolemy III Euergetes, 4
- Ancient Greek Olympiad (summer): 134th Olympiad, year 2
- Assyrian calendar: 4508
- Balinese saka calendar: N/A
- Bengali calendar: −836 – −835
- Berber calendar: 708
- Buddhist calendar: 302
- Burmese calendar: −880
- Byzantine calendar: 5266–5267
- Chinese calendar: 丁巳年 (Fire Snake); 2455 or 2248 — to — 戊午年 (Earth Horse); 2456 or 2249
- Coptic calendar: −526 – −525
- Discordian calendar: 924
- Ethiopian calendar: −250 – −249
- Hebrew calendar: 3518–3519
- Hindu calendars
- Vikram Samvat: −186 – −185
- Shaka Samvat: N/A
- Kali Yuga: 2858–2859
- Holocene calendar: 9758
- Iranian calendar: 864 BP – 863 BP
- Islamic calendar: 891 BH – 890 BH
- Javanese calendar: N/A
- Julian calendar: N/A
- Korean calendar: 2091
- Minguo calendar: 2154 before ROC 民前2154年
- Nanakshahi calendar: −1710
- Seleucid era: 69/70 AG
- Thai solar calendar: 300–301
- Tibetan calendar: མེ་མོ་སྦྲུལ་ལོ་ (female Fire-Snake) −116 or −497 or −1269 — to — ས་ཕོ་རྟ་ལོ་ (male Earth-Horse) −115 or −496 or −1268

Year 243 BC was a year of the pre-Julian Roman calendar. At the time it was known as the Year of the Consulship of Fundulus and Galus (or, less frequently, year 511 Ab urbe condita). The denomination 243 BC for this year has been used since the early medieval period, when the Anno Domini calendar era became the prevalent method in Europe for naming years.

== Events ==
=== By place ===
==== Egypt ====
- Ptolemy III returns from Syria due to a revolt in Egypt. As a result, Seleucus II is able to regain control of his kingdom with the Egyptians being pushed out of Mesopotamia and part of Northern Syria.
- Ptolemy III returns from his conquests of Seleucid territory with a large amount of treasure and works of art, including many statues of Egyptian gods carried off to Persia by Cambyses. He restores the statues to the Egyptian temples and earns the title of Euergetes ("Benefactor").

==== Greece ====
- Without a declaration of hostilities, Greek statesman, Aratus of Sicyon, who has gradually built up the Achaean League into a major power in Greece, makes a surprise attack on Corinth and forces the withdrawal of the Macedonian occupation troops. Megara, Troezen, and Epidaurus also desert the Macedonian King Antigonus II.
- Drawing upon the tradition of the Spartan lawgiver, Lycurgus, the young Eurypontid king of Sparta, Agis IV, seeks to reform a system that distributes the land and wealth unequally and burden the poor with debt. He proposes the cancellation of debts and the division of the Spartan homeland into separate lots for each of its citizens. Full citizenship is to be extended to many perioeci (voteless freemen) and foreigners. In addition to pursuing these reforms, Agis seeks the restoration of the Lycurgan system of military training. Agis is supported by his wealthy mother and grandmother (who surrender their property), by his uncle Agesilaus, and by Lysander, who is an ephor (magistrate with the duty of limiting the power of the king).

==== China ====
- The Qin general Meng Ao sacks the Wei cities of Shizhang and Yougui.
- The Zhao general Li Mu takes the cities of Wusui and Fancheng from the State of Yan.

== Births ==
- Mago Barca, Carthaginian general and brother of Hannibal (d. 203 BC)
- Prusias I Cholus (the Lame), king of Bithynia (approximate date)
- Seleucus III Ceraunus, king of the Seleucid Kingdom (d. 223 BC)

== Deaths ==
- Persaeus, Greek Stoic philosopher and friend of Zeno of Citium
- Xinling, Chinese statesman and general (Warring States Period)
