= 241 BC =

241 BC in various calendars
Gregorian calendar	241 BC; CCXLI BC
Ab urbe condita	513
Ancient Egypt era	XXXIII dynasty, 83
Pharaoh	Ptolemy III Euergetes, 6
Ancient Greek Olympiad (summer)	134th Olympiad, year 4
Assyrian calendar	4510
Balinese saka calendar	N/A
Bengali calendar	−834 – −833
Berber calendar	710
Buddhist calendar	304
Burmese calendar	−878
Byzantine calendar	5268–5269
Chinese calendar	己未年 (Earth Goat); 2457 or 2250 — to — 庚申年 (Metal Monkey); 2458 or 2251
Coptic calendar	−524 – −523
Discordian calendar	926
Ethiopian calendar	−248 – −247
Hebrew calendar	3520–3521
- Hindu calendars
Vikram Samvat	−184 – −183
Shaka Samvat	N/A
Kali Yuga	2860–2861
Holocene calendar	9760
Iranian calendar	862 BP – 861 BP
Islamic calendar	889 BH – 887 BH
Javanese calendar	N/A
Julian calendar	N/A
Korean calendar	2093
Minguo calendar	2152 before ROC 民前2152年
Nanakshahi calendar	−1708
Seleucid era	71/72 AG
Thai solar calendar	302–303
Tibetan calendar	ས་མོ་ལུག་ལོ་ (female Earth-Sheep) −114 or −495 or −1267 — to — ལྕགས་ཕོ་སྤྲེ་ལོ་ (male Iron-Monkey) −113 or −494 or −1266

Year 241 BC was a year of the pre-Julian Roman calendar. At the time it was known as the Year of the Consulship of Atticus and Cerco (or, less frequently, year 513 Ab urbe condita). The denomination 241 BC for this year has been used since the early medieval period, when the Anno Domini calendar era became the prevalent method in Europe for naming years.

== Events ==
=== By place ===
==== Greece ====
- The Eurypontid King of Sparta, Agis IV, is called away from Sparta when Aratus of Sicyon, temporarily Sparta's ally, requests Agis' aid in his war against the Aetolians. Upon his return, Agis finds that his supporters are discontented with the rule of his uncle, Agesilaus, and are disillusioned by the delay in implementing Agis IV's reforms. As a result, the Agiad king of Sparta, Leonidas II, gains power, supported by mercenaries. Rather than engage in a war with Leonidas, Agis takes sanctuary in a temple, but is enticed out, summarily tried and then executed, along with his mother and grandmother.
- Archidamus V, son of the Spartan King, Eudamidas II, and grandson of Archidamus IV, flees to Messenia after the murder of his brother Agis IV.
- As general of the Achaean League, Aratus of Sicyon defeats the Aetolians at Pellene and then pursues a policy of establishing democracies in the Peloponnese.

==== Roman Republic ====
- March 10 – Battle of the Aegates: The Carthaginian fleet sent to relieve the Roman blockade of the Sicilian cities of Lilybaeum and Drepanum is totally defeated near the Aegates Islands off western Sicily by the Roman fleet led by Roman consul and commander Gaius Lutatius Catulus. The result is a decisive Roman victory which forces an end to the protracted First Punic War, to Rome's distinct advantage.
- The Romans capture Sicily
- The Carthaginians under Hamilcar Barca are forced to accept severe peace terms and agree to evacuate Sicily. As part of the treaty with Rome, Carthage agrees to abandon all its claims on Sicily, to refrain from sailing her warships in Italian waters and to pay an indemnity of 3,200 talents. However, the Carthaginian army is allowed to return home with its arms. Rome is now the dominant power in the Western Mediterranean basin.
- The Falisci people of Falerii Veteres revolt against Rome, but is crushed in six days. Falerii Veteres is destroyed and the people resettled to the less defensible Falerii Novi.

==== Carthage ====
- A mercenary army of some 20,000 is transported from Sicily to Carthaginian territory, by Carthaginian commander, Gisco. Upon arrival in Carthaginian territory, the mercenaries submit a demand to Hanno the Great for payment of their contracts. Hanno attempts, unsuccessfully, to convince the mercenaries to accept smaller payments due to Carthage's impoverished post-war conditions. Negotiations break down. The mercenaries take up arms, march on Tunis, occupy it, and threaten Carthage directly.
- Given their strong position, the mercenaries inflate their demands and request payment for the non-mercenary Libyan conscripts in the army as well. Gesco is sent to negotiate with the mercenaries at Tunis. Negotiations break down, Gisco is captured, and the Mercenary War commences.

==== Pergamum ====
- Attalus I Soter succeeds his uncle, Eumenes I, to the throne of Pergamum. He defeats the Galatians at the Battle of the Caecus River.

==== Egypt ====
- Peace is finally reached between Ptolemy III and Seleucus II. Ptolemy manages to keep the Orontes River region in Syria and Antioch as well as Ephesus in Asia Minor and Thrace and Cilicia.

==== China ====
- Five of the seven major warring states: Chu, Zhao, Wei, Yan, and Han, form an alliance to fight the rising power of Qin. King Kaolie of Chu is named the leader of the alliance, and Lord Chunshen the military commander, with Pang Nuan of Zhao also serving as a general. The coalition penetrates as far as the Qin town of Zui, west of the strategic Hangu Pass and in the Qin heartland of Guanzhong, but they are defeated. Afterwards, Chu moves its capital east to Shouchun, further away from the threat of Qin. Qin counterattacks, sacking the Wei city of Chaoge.

== Births ==
- Antiochus III the Great, younger son of Seleucus II Callinicus, the 6th ruler of the Seleucid Empire (d. 187 BC)

== Deaths ==
- Agis IV, Eurypontid King of Sparta who has failed in his attempt to reform Sparta's economic and political structure (b. c. 265 BC)
- Agesistrata, Spartan Queen Consort
- Arcesilaus, Greek philosopher, who has become the sixth head of the Greek Academy founded by Plato (b. c. 316 BC)
- Eumenes I, ruler of Pergamum from 263 BC, liberator of the city from the overlordship of the Seleucids
- Tiberius Coruncanius, Roman consul and military commander for the battles against Pyrrhus of Epirus
