= 203 BC =

203 BC in various calendars
| Gregorian calendar | 203 BC; CCIII BC |
| Ab urbe condita | 551 |
| Ancient Egypt era | XXXIII dynasty, 121 |
| Pharaoh | Ptolemy V Epiphanes, 1 |
| Ancient Greek Olympiad (summer) | 144th Olympiad, year 2 |
| Assyrian calendar | 4548 |
| Balinese saka calendar | N/A |
| Bengali calendar | −796 – −795 |
| Berber calendar | 748 |
| Buddhist calendar | 342 |
| Burmese calendar | −840 |
| Byzantine calendar | 5306–5307 |
| Chinese calendar | 丁酉年 (Fire Rooster); 2495 or 2288 — to — 戊戌年 (Earth Dog); 2496 or 2289 |
| Coptic calendar | −486 – −485 |
| Discordian calendar | 964 |
| Ethiopian calendar | −210 – −209 |
| Hebrew calendar | 3558–3559 |
- Hindu calendars
| Vikram Samvat | −146 – −145 |
| Shaka Samvat | N/A |
| Kali Yuga | 2898–2899 |
| Holocene calendar | 9798 |
| Iranian calendar | 824 BP – 823 BP |
| Islamic calendar | 849 BH – 848 BH |
| Javanese calendar | N/A |
| Julian calendar | N/A |
| Korean calendar | 2131 |
| Minguo calendar | 2114 before ROC 民前2114年 |
| Nanakshahi calendar | −1670 |
| Seleucid era | 109/110 AG |
| Thai solar calendar | 340–341 |
| Tibetan calendar | མེ་མོ་བྱ་ལོ་ (female Fire-Bird) −76 or −457 or −1229 — to — ས་ཕོ་ཁྱི་ལོ་ (male Earth-Dog) −75 or −456 or −1228 |

Year 203 BC was a year of the pre-Julian Roman calendar. At the time it was known as the Year of the Consulship of Caepio and Geminus (or, less frequently, year 551 Ab urbe condita). The denomination 203 BC for this year has been used since the early medieval period, when the Anno Domini calendar era became the prevalent method in Europe for naming years.

== Events ==
=== By place ===
==== Carthage ====
- The Roman general, Publius Cornelius Scipio, while undertaking peace negotiations with the Carthaginians at Utica, makes a surprise attack on the Carthaginian camp and destroys it. Then, sweeping down on the forces that the Carthaginians and their allies, the Numidians, are trying to muster on the Great Plains near the upper Bagradas River (in modern Tunisia), he smashes that army in the Battle of the Great Plains. The Numidian king, Syphax, and the Carthaginian leader, Hasdrubal Gisco, manage to escape separately.
- The Roman general, Gaius Laelius, and Rome's Numidian ally, Masinissa, follow Syphax towards Cirta, the Numidian capital. In the pursuit, Syphax is captured after his badly wounded horse throws him off. He is delivered to Scipio and is made a prisoner of the Romans, dying in the Italian town of Alba Fucens later in the year.
- Masinissa becomes king of both the Massyli and the Massaesyli tribes in Numidia and remains a loyal ally to the Romans.
- Hasdrubal Gisco persuades the Carthaginians to raise a new army and to send for Hannibal to return home from Italy. Hannibal finally leaves Italy and returns to Carthage.
- The Carthaginian general, Mago Barca, is defeated and wounded by the Romans in the Battle of Insubria. He dies of his wounds on the return voyage to Carthage.
- A preliminary armistice between Carthage and Rome is declared and the Carthaginian armies accept Scipio's severe terms. However, on his return to Carthage, Hannibal concentrates the remnants of the Carthaginian forces at Hadrumetum (modern Sousse, Tunisia) and prepares them for battle.

==== China ====
- Han Xin completes the conquest of Qi, and Liu Bang appoints him as its king.
- After Xiang Yu fails to persuade Han Xin to remain neutral, Han Xin and Liu Bang launch a five-pronged invasion of Chu. They decisively defeat Xiang Yu in the Battle of Chen and the Battle of Gaixia.
- Xiang Yu flees toward Wuyue and, pursued by Han cavalry, commits suicide.

== Deaths ==
- Mago Barca, Carthaginian general during the Second Punic War against Rome who has accompanied his brother Hannibal on the invasion of Italy (b. 243 BC)
- Quintus Fabius Maximus Verrucosus, Roman general and statesman whose cautious delaying tactics (which have led to his surname Cunctator, meaning "delayer") during the early stages of the Second Punic War have given Rome time to recover its strength and take the offensive against the invading Carthaginian army of Hannibal (b. c. 275 BC)
- Syphax, Numidian king allied with the Carthaginians during the Second Punic War against Rome
