= 153 BC =

153 BC in various calendars
- Gregorian calendar: 153 BC; CLIII BC
- Ab urbe condita: 601
- Ancient Egypt era: XXXIII dynasty, 171
- Pharaoh: Ptolemy VI Philometor, 28
- Ancient Greek Olympiad (summer): 156th Olympiad, year 4
- Assyrian calendar: 4598
- Balinese saka calendar: N/A
- Bengali calendar: −746 – −745
- Berber calendar: 798
- Buddhist calendar: 392
- Burmese calendar: −790
- Byzantine calendar: 5356–5357
- Chinese calendar: 丁亥年 (Fire Pig); 2545 or 2338 — to — 戊子年 (Earth Rat); 2546 or 2339
- Coptic calendar: −436 – −435
- Discordian calendar: 1014
- Ethiopian calendar: −160 – −159
- Hebrew calendar: 3608–3609
- Hindu calendars
- Vikram Samvat: −96 – −95
- Shaka Samvat: N/A
- Kali Yuga: 2948–2949
- Holocene calendar: 9848
- Iranian calendar: 774 BP – 773 BP
- Islamic calendar: 798 BH – 797 BH
- Javanese calendar: N/A
- Julian calendar: N/A
- Korean calendar: 2181
- Minguo calendar: 2064 before ROC 民前2064年
- Nanakshahi calendar: −1620
- Seleucid era: 159/160 AG
- Thai solar calendar: 390–391
- Tibetan calendar: མེ་མོ་ཕག་ལོ་ (female Fire-Boar) −26 or −407 or −1179 — to — ས་ཕོ་བྱི་བ་ལོ་ (male Earth-Rat) −25 or −406 or −1178

Year 153 BC was a year of the pre-Julian Roman calendar. At the time it was known as the Year of the Consulship of Nobilior and Luscus (or, less frequently, year 601 Ab urbe condita). The denomination 153 BC for this year has been used since the early medieval period, when the Anno Domini calendar era became the prevalent method in Europe for naming years.

== Events ==
=== By place ===
==== Roman Republic ====
- The uprisings in Rome's Hispanic provinces oblige the year's consuls to take office earlier than the traditional date of March 15, a change that becomes permanent. Some suggest that, as a consequence, January 1 becomes the first day of the Roman year.

==== Seleucid Empire ====
- The Seleucid king Demetrius I Soter's relations with Attalus II Philadelphus of Pergamum and Ptolemy VI Philometor of Egypt deteriorate to the point where they support a rival claimant to the Syrian throne, Alexander Balas, who claims to be the son of the former Seleucid king Antiochus IV Epiphanes and, therefore, a first cousin of Demetrius. He has been "discovered" by Heracleides, a former minister of Antiochus IV and brother of Timarchus, who has been executed by Demetrius I Soter in 160 BC after leading a revolt against him in Media.
- As a result of the rise of the pretender, Alexander Balas, Demetrius I Soter is forced to recall most of his garrisons in Judea. To retain control of Judea, he makes a bid to gain the loyalty of Jonathan Maccabeus, whom he permits to recruit an army and to take back the hostages that the Syrians are holding in the city of Acre. Jonathan gladly accepts these terms, takes up residence in Jerusalem and begins to fortify the city, becoming High Priest of Jerusalem until 143 BC.

==== Greece ====
- Substantial parts of the city of Sikyon are destroyed by an earthquake.
