= 150 BC =

150 BC in various calendars
- Gregorian calendar: 150 BC; CL BC
- Ab urbe condita: 604
- Ancient Egypt era: XXXIII dynasty, 174
- Pharaoh: Ptolemy VI Philometor, 31
- Ancient Greek Olympiad (summer): 157th Olympiad, year 3
- Assyrian calendar: 4601
- Balinese saka calendar: N/A
- Bengali calendar: −743 – −742
- Berber calendar: 801
- Buddhist calendar: 395
- Burmese calendar: −787
- Byzantine calendar: 5359–5360
- Chinese calendar: 庚寅年 (Metal Tiger); 2548 or 2341 — to — 辛卯年 (Metal Rabbit); 2549 or 2342
- Coptic calendar: −433 – −432
- Discordian calendar: 1017
- Ethiopian calendar: −157 – −156
- Hebrew calendar: 3611–3612
- Hindu calendars
- Vikram Samvat: −93 – −92
- Shaka Samvat: N/A
- Kali Yuga: 2951–2952
- Holocene calendar: 9851
- Iranian calendar: 771 BP – 770 BP
- Islamic calendar: 795 BH – 794 BH
- Javanese calendar: N/A
- Julian calendar: N/A
- Korean calendar: 2184
- Minguo calendar: 2061 before ROC 民前2061年
- Nanakshahi calendar: −1617
- Seleucid era: 162/163 AG
- Thai solar calendar: 393–394
- Tibetan calendar: ལྕགས་ཕོ་སྟག་ལོ་ (male Iron-Tiger) −23 or −404 or −1176 — to — ལྕགས་མོ་ཡོས་ལོ་ (female Iron-Hare) −22 or −403 or −1175

Year 150 BC was a year of the pre-Julian Roman calendar. At the time it was known as the Year of the Consulship of Flamininus and Balbus (or, less frequently, year 604 Ab urbe condita). The denomination 150 BC for this year has been used since the early medieval period, when the Anno Domini calendar era became the prevalent method in Europe for naming years.

== Events ==
=== By place ===
==== Carthage ====
- Scipio Aemilianus is sent by the Roman general, Lucius Licinius Lucullus, to Numidia to obtain some elephants from the Numidian king Masinissa, the friend of his grandfather Scipio Africanus. While there, he witnesses a great but indecisive battle between the Numidians and the Carthaginians. The latter then ask Scipio Aemilianus to arrange a settlement, but the negotiations break down.

==== Roman Republic ====
- The Roman Senate shows displeasure with Carthage's decision to wage war against its neighbour without Roman consent, and tells Carthage that in order to avoid a war it has to "satisfy the Roman People". The Roman censor, Cato the Elder, urges the destruction of Carthage and the Roman Senate orders the gathering of an army.

==== Seleucid Empire ====
- The pretender to the Seleucid throne, Alexander Balas, who claims to be the son of the late Antiochus IV, defeats the Seleucid king, Demetrius I Soter, in battle and kills him. The Roman Senate, along with Attalus II Philadelphus of Pergamum and Ptolemy VI Philometor of Egypt, support Alexander Balas and he becomes the ruler of the Seleucid Empire. Demetrius I Soter's son, Demetrius, goes into exile in Crete.
- The new king of the Seleucid Empire, Alexander Balas, marries Cleopatra Thea, a daughter of Ptolemy VI Philometor of Egypt.

==== Asia Minor ====
- Nicomedes, the son of king Prusias II of Bithynia, who has been sent to Rome to argue for smaller reparations arising from his father's unsuccessful war against Pergamum, gains the support of the Roman Senate to the point where Prusias sends an emissary with secret orders to assassinate Nicomedes. However, the emissary reveals the plot to Nicomedes and persuades him to rebel against his father.
- Mithridates V Euergetes succeeds his uncle Mithridates IV Philopator Philadelphus as king of Pontus. He continues the strategy of maintaining an alliance with the Romans which was started by his predecessor.

==== Hispania ====
- The Romans, led by praetor Servius Sulpicius Galba, defeat the Lusitanians in a major battle in Hispania. He then breaks his promise to the defeated Lusitanian rebels by instituting a massacre of 9,000 of their number during the peace talks. Later 20,000 more Lusitanians are sold as slaves in Gaul.

=== By topic ===
==== Art ====
- The making of the statue Hellenistic Ruler begins and is finished ten years later. It is now kept at the Museo Nazionale Romano in Rome.
- The enlargement of the Great Stupa of Sanchi, Madhya Pradesh, India begins, taking about 100 years.

== Deaths ==
- Demetrius I Soter, Seleucid king of Syria (b. c. 187 BC)
- Mithridates IV Philopator Philadelphus, king of Pontus
- Paerisades III, king of the Bosporan Kingdom
