= 87 BC =

87 BC in various calendars
- Gregorian calendar: 87 BC; LXXXVII BC
- Ab urbe condita: 667
- Ancient Egypt era: XXXIII dynasty, 237
- Pharaoh: Ptolemy IX Lathyros, 2
- Ancient Greek Olympiad (summer): 173rd Olympiad, year 2
- Assyrian calendar: 4664
- Balinese saka calendar: N/A
- Bengali calendar: −680 – −679
- Berber calendar: 864
- Buddhist calendar: 458
- Burmese calendar: −724
- Byzantine calendar: 5422–5423
- Chinese calendar: 癸巳年 (Water Snake); 2611 or 2404 — to — 甲午年 (Wood Horse); 2612 or 2405
- Coptic calendar: −370 – −369
- Discordian calendar: 1080
- Ethiopian calendar: −94 – −93
- Hebrew calendar: 3674–3675
- Hindu calendars
- Vikram Samvat: −30 – −29
- Shaka Samvat: N/A
- Kali Yuga: 3014–3015
- Holocene calendar: 9914
- Iranian calendar: 708 BP – 707 BP
- Islamic calendar: 730 BH – 729 BH
- Javanese calendar: N/A
- Julian calendar: N/A
- Korean calendar: 2247
- Minguo calendar: 1998 before ROC 民前1998年
- Nanakshahi calendar: −1554
- Seleucid era: 225/226 AG
- Thai solar calendar: 456–457
- Tibetan calendar: ཆུ་མོ་སྦྲུལ་ལོ་ (female Water-Snake); 40 or −341 or −1113 — to — ཤིང་ཕོ་རྟ་ལོ་ (male Wood-Horse); 41 or −340 or −1112

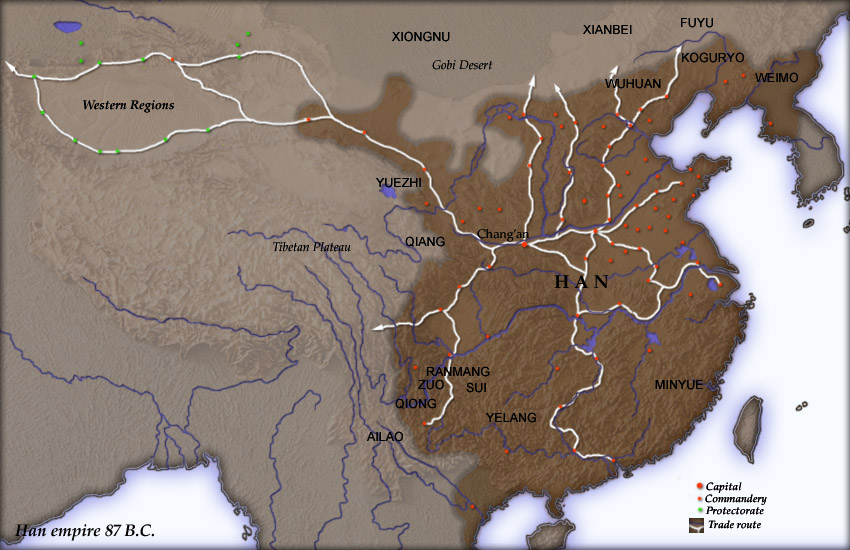
The Han dynasty in 87 BC (provinces in brown)

Year 87 BC was a year of the pre-Julian Roman calendar. At the time it was known as the Year of the Consulship of Octavius and Cinna and the Second Year of Houyuan. The denomination 87 BC for this year has been used since the early medieval period, when the Anno Domini calendar era became the prevalent method in Europe for naming years.

== Events ==
=== By place ===
==== Roman Republic ====
- Gnaeus Octavius and Lucius Cornelius Cinna are inaugurated as consuls. With Cinna seeking to enrol the Italians into all the tribes per vim, he is expelled from the city by Octavius and replaced as consul by Lucius Merula. Mobilising against the regime at Rome, Cinna marches on the city, occupies it with the support of Gaius Marius, and regains his consulship. In the aftermath Octavius is killed, Merula is forced to suicide.
- First Mithridatic War: Siege of Athens (87–86 BC) – Sulla arrives in Greece and from Autumn besieges Athens. He orders Lucius Licinius Lucullus to raise a fleet from Rome's allies around the eastern Mediterranean.

==== China ====
- March 29 – Emperor Wu of Han dies after a 54-year reign in which he leads the Han dynasty (China) through its greatest expansion. The Empire's borders span from modern Kyrgyzstan in the west, to Mongolia in the north, to Korea in the east, and to northern Vietnam in the south.
- March 30 – The eight-year-old Liu Fuling becomes emperor, with Huo Guang General-in-Chief and regent.

=== By topic ===
==== Technology ====
- Antikythera mechanism manufactured.

==== Astronomy ====
- Halley's Comet makes its third confirmed apparition, recorded by Babylonian scribes as being visible in the sky "day beyond day" for about one month.

== Births ==
- Lucius Munatius Plancus, Roman consul (approximate date)

== Deaths ==
- March 29 – Han Wudi, emperor of the Han dynasty (b. 157 BC)
- Apollodorus of Artemita, Greek writer
- Gaius Atilius Serranus, Roman consul and senator
- Gaius Julius Caesar Strabo, Roman politician
- Gnaeus Pompeius Strabo, Roman general and politician
- Gotarzes I, ruler (shah) of the Parthian Empire
- Lucius Cornelius Merula, Roman politician and priest
- Lucius Julius Caesar, Roman consul (killed by partisans of Gaius Marius)
- Marcus Antonius, Roman consul (executed by order of Marius and Cinna)
- Publius Licinius Crassus, Roman consul and censor (killed by Marians invading Rome)
- Quintus Ancharius, Roman politician (executed by order of Marius and Cinna)

== Bibliography ==
- Broughton, Thomas Robert Shannon (1952). The magistrates of the Roman republic. Vol. 2. New York: American Philological Association.
