= 157 BC =

157 BC in various calendars
- Gregorian calendar: 157 BC; CLVII BC
- Ab urbe condita: 597
- Ancient Egypt era: XXXIII dynasty, 167
- Pharaoh: Ptolemy VI Philometor, 24
- Ancient Greek Olympiad (summer): 155th Olympiad, year 4
- Assyrian calendar: 4594
- Balinese saka calendar: N/A
- Bengali calendar: −750 – −749
- Berber calendar: 794
- Buddhist calendar: 388
- Burmese calendar: −794
- Byzantine calendar: 5352–5353
- Chinese calendar: 癸未年 (Water Goat); 2541 or 2334 — to — 甲申年 (Wood Monkey); 2542 or 2335
- Coptic calendar: −440 – −439
- Discordian calendar: 1010
- Ethiopian calendar: −164 – −163
- Hebrew calendar: 3604–3605
- Hindu calendars
- Vikram Samvat: −100 – −99
- Shaka Samvat: N/A
- Kali Yuga: 2944–2945
- Holocene calendar: 9844
- Iranian calendar: 778 BP – 777 BP
- Islamic calendar: 802 BH – 801 BH
- Javanese calendar: N/A
- Julian calendar: N/A
- Korean calendar: 2177
- Minguo calendar: 2068 before ROC 民前2068年
- Nanakshahi calendar: −1624
- Seleucid era: 155/156 AG
- Thai solar calendar: 386–387
- Tibetan calendar: ཆུ་མོ་ལུག་ལོ་ (female Water-Sheep) −30 or −411 or −1183 — to — ཤིང་ཕོ་སྤྲེ་ལོ་ (male Wood-Monkey) −29 or −410 or −1182

Year 157 BC was a year of the pre-Julian Roman calendar. At the time it was known as the Year of the Consulship of Caesar and Orestes (or, less frequently, year 597 Ab urbe condita) and the Seventh Year of Houyuan. The denomination 157 BC for this year has been used since the early medieval period, when the Anno Domini calendar era became the prevalent method in Europe for naming years.

== Events ==
=== By place ===
==== Roman Republic ====
- The Carthaginians, prevented by their treaty with Rome from engaging in armed resistance, but equally guaranteed against any loss of territory, appeal to Rome against the depredations of King Masinissa of Numidia. The Roman censor Marcus Porcius Cato heads a commission which arbitrates a truce between Carthage and her former ally, Masinissa.
- During his time in Carthage, Cato is so struck by the evidence of Carthaginian prosperity that he is convinced that the security of Rome now depends on the annihilation of Carthage. From this time on, Cato keeps repeating the cry "Ceterum censeo Carthaginem esse delendam" ("Moreover, I advise that Carthage must be destroyed") at the end of all his speeches, no matter what subject they concern.
- After Ariarathes V has been deposed from the Cappadocian throne by the Seleucid king Demetrius I Soter and has fled to Rome, the new king of Cappadocia, Orophernes, sends two ambassadors to Rome to join the Seleucid emissaries of Demetrius in opposing Ariarathes V's return to power. Despite their efforts, Ariarathes V is restored to his throne by the Romans. However, Rome allows Orophernes to reign jointly with him. The joint government, however, does not last long, as Ariarathes V becomes sole king of Cappadocia shortly afterwards.

==== Seleucid Empire ====
- Jonathan Maccabeus is recognised by the Seleucids as a minor king within their dominions.

== Births ==
- July 30 – Wu of Han, who will be emperor of the Chinese Han dynasty from 141 BC (d. 87 BC)
- Gaius Marius, Roman general, consul (approximate year) (d. 86 BC)
- Sanatruces (also known as Sinatruces or Sanatruk), King of Parthia who will rule the Parthian Empire from around 77 BC (approximate date) (d. c. 70 BC)

== Deaths ==
- July 6 – Wen of Han, Emperor of the Chinese Han dynasty since 180 BC (b. 200 BC)
