= 463 BC =

463 BC in various calendars
- Gregorian calendar: 463 BC; CDLXIII BC
- Ab urbe condita: 291
- Ancient Egypt era: XXVII dynasty, 63
- Pharaoh: Artaxerxes I of Persia, 3
- Ancient Greek Olympiad (summer): 79th Olympiad, year 2
- Assyrian calendar: 4288
- Balinese saka calendar: N/A
- Bengali calendar: −1056 – −1055
- Berber calendar: 488
- Buddhist calendar: 82
- Burmese calendar: −1100
- Byzantine calendar: 5046–5047
- Chinese calendar: 丁丑年 (Fire Ox); 2235 or 2028 — to — 戊寅年 (Earth Tiger); 2236 or 2029
- Coptic calendar: −746 – −745
- Discordian calendar: 704
- Ethiopian calendar: −470 – −469
- Hebrew calendar: 3298–3299
- Hindu calendars
- Vikram Samvat: −406 – −405
- Shaka Samvat: N/A
- Kali Yuga: 2638–2639
- Holocene calendar: 9538
- Iranian calendar: 1084 BP – 1083 BP
- Islamic calendar: 1117 BH – 1116 BH
- Javanese calendar: N/A
- Julian calendar: N/A
- Korean calendar: 1871
- Minguo calendar: 2374 before ROC 民前2374年
- Nanakshahi calendar: −1930
- Thai solar calendar: 80–81
- Tibetan calendar: མེ་མོ་གླང་ལོ་ (female Fire-Ox) −336 or −717 or −1489 — to — ས་ཕོ་སྟག་ལོ་ (male Earth-Tiger) −335 or −716 or −1488

Year 463 BC was a year of the pre-Julian Roman calendar. At the time, it was known as the Year of the Consulship of Priscus and Helva (or, less frequently, year 291 Ab urbe condita). The denomination 463 BC for this year has been used since the early medieval period, when the Anno Domini calendar era became the prevalent method in Europe for naming years.

== Events ==
=== By place ===
==== Rome ====
- The Senate and People of Rome appoint Gaius Aemilius Mamercus interrex.

==== Greece ====
- In Athens, the democratic statesman Ephialtes and the young Pericles attempt to get the oligarchic Kimon ostracized for allegedly receiving bribes. Kimon is charged by Pericles and other democratic politicians with having been bribed not to attack the King of Macedonia (who may have been suspected of covertly helping the Thasian rebels). Though Kimon is acquitted, his influence on the Athenian people is waning.
- Themistocles, who is in exile, approaches the Persian King Artaxerxes I seeking Persian help in regaining power in Athens. Artaxerxes is unwilling to help him, but gives him the satrapy of Magnesia.
- After a two year siege, Thasos falls to the Athenians under Kimon who compels the Thasians to destroy their walls, surrender their ships, pay an indemnity and an annual contribution to Athens.
