= 467 BC =

467 BC in various calendars
- Gregorian calendar: 467 BC; CDLXVII BC
- Ab urbe condita: 287
- Ancient Egypt era: XXVII dynasty, 59
- Pharaoh: Xerxes I of Persia, 19
- Ancient Greek Olympiad (summer): 78th Olympiad, year 2
- Assyrian calendar: 4284
- Balinese saka calendar: N/A
- Bengali calendar: −1060 – −1059
- Berber calendar: 484
- Buddhist calendar: 78
- Burmese calendar: −1104
- Byzantine calendar: 5042–5043
- Chinese calendar: 癸酉年 (Water Rooster); 2231 or 2024 — to — 甲戌年 (Wood Dog); 2232 or 2025
- Coptic calendar: −750 – −749
- Discordian calendar: 700
- Ethiopian calendar: −474 – −473
- Hebrew calendar: 3294–3295
- Hindu calendars
- Vikram Samvat: −410 – −409
- Shaka Samvat: N/A
- Kali Yuga: 2634–2635
- Holocene calendar: 9534
- Iranian calendar: 1088 BP – 1087 BP
- Islamic calendar: 1121 BH – 1120 BH
- Javanese calendar: N/A
- Julian calendar: N/A
- Korean calendar: 1867
- Minguo calendar: 2378 before ROC 民前2378年
- Nanakshahi calendar: −1934
- Thai solar calendar: 76–77
- Tibetan calendar: ཆུ་མོ་བྱ་ལོ་ (female Water-Bird) −340 or −721 or −1493 — to — ཤིང་ཕོ་ཁྱི་ལོ་ (male Wood-Dog) −339 or −720 or −1492

Year 467 BC was a year of the pre-Julian Roman calendar. At the time, it was known as the Year of the Consulship of Mamercus and Vibulanus (or, less frequently, year 287 Ab urbe condita). The denomination 467 BC for this year has been used since the early medieval period, when the Anno Domini calendar era became the prevalent method in Europe for naming years.

== Events ==
=== By place ===
==== Roman Republic ====
- Quintus Fabius Vibulanus becomes consul of the Roman Republic for the first of three times.

==== Sicily ====
- After the death of his brother Hiero I, Thrasybulus becomes Tyrant of Syracuse.

=== By topic ===
==== Literature ====
- Aeschylus writes Seven Against Thebes and wins the Dionysia.
- Aeschylus' play, The Persians is produced in Sicily.

== Deaths ==
- Hiero I, Tyrant of Syracuse
