= 55 BC =

55 BC in various calendars
- Gregorian calendar: 55 BC; LV BC
- Ab urbe condita: 699
- Ancient Egypt era: XXXIII dynasty, 269
- Pharaoh: Ptolemy XII Auletes, 26
- Ancient Greek Olympiad (summer): 181st Olympiad, year 2
- Assyrian calendar: 4696
- Balinese saka calendar: N/A
- Bengali calendar: −648 – −647
- Berber calendar: 896
- Buddhist calendar: 490
- Burmese calendar: −692
- Byzantine calendar: 5454–5455
- Chinese calendar: 乙丑年 (Wood Ox); 2643 or 2436 — to — 丙寅年 (Fire Tiger); 2644 or 2437
- Coptic calendar: −338 – −337
- Discordian calendar: 1112
- Ethiopian calendar: −62 – −61
- Hebrew calendar: 3706–3707
- Hindu calendars
- Vikram Samvat: 2–3
- Shaka Samvat: N/A
- Kali Yuga: 3046–3047
- Holocene calendar: 9946
- Iranian calendar: 676 BP – 675 BP
- Islamic calendar: 697 BH – 696 BH
- Javanese calendar: N/A
- Julian calendar: N/A
- Korean calendar: 2279
- Minguo calendar: 1966 before ROC 民前1966年
- Nanakshahi calendar: −1522
- Seleucid era: 257/258 AG
- Thai solar calendar: 488–489
- Tibetan calendar: ཤིང་མོ་གླང་ལོ་ (female Wood-Ox); 72 or −309 or −1081 — to — མེ་ཕོ་སྟག་ལོ་ (male Fire-Tiger); 73 or −308 or −1080

Year 55 BC was a year of the pre-Julian Roman calendar. At the time, it was known as the Year of the Consulship of Crassus and Pompey (or, less frequently, year 699 Ab urbe condita). The denomination 55 BC for this year has been used since the early medieval period, when the Anno Domini calendar era became the prevalent method in Europe for naming years.

== Events ==
=== By place ===
==== Roman Republic ====
- Consuls: Marcus Licinius Crassus and Gnaeus Pompeius Magnus.
- Consuls Marcus Licinius Crassus and Gnaeus Pompeius Magnus pass the Lex Trebonia.
- Pompey's Theater, the first permanent (non-wooden) theatre in Rome is built. Built of stone on the Field of Mars, it included a temple to Venus Victorious, a public courtyard, and a meeting hall or curia in the far end near the "Sacred Area".
- Fourth year of Julius Caesar's Gallic Wars:
  - Spring – Julius Caesar starts the season campaigning in Illyricum (in the Balkan region) against the Pirustae, who have been raiding Roman territory.
  - Summer – Julius Caesar defeats the Usipetes and the Tencteri, two Germanic tribes who have been driven across the Rhine River by the Suebi. He spreads Roman law and order, and makes the whole country as far as the Channel accessible to trade.
  - May – Julius Caesar defeats a Germanic army and massacres the women and children near the Meuse and Rhine Rivers (now known as the city of Kessel in the Netherlands).
  - June – Julius Caesar crosses the Rhine River near modern-day Koblenz. He constructs a wooden bridge between Andernach and Neuwied (Germany).

==== Britain ====
- August 22 or August 26 – Julius Caesar commands his first invasions of Britain, likely a reconnaissance-in-force expedition, in response to the Britons giving military aid to his Gallic enemies. Caesar retreats back to Gaul when the majority of his force is prevented from landing by storms.

==== Egypt ====
Ptolemy XII Auletes is restored to the Egyptian throne by the aid of Aulus Gabinius, Roman governor of Syria, and has his daughter Berenice IV executed for rebellion.

==== Parthia ====
- Mithridates IV, claimant to the throne of Parthia, supported by Aulus Gabinius, Roman governor of Syria, is defeated by Surena, general under Orodes, in the Battle of Seleucia.

== Births ==
- Tibullus, Roman Latin poet (approximate date)

== Deaths ==
- Archelaus, high priest of Comana (Cappadocia)
- Berenice IV Epiphaneia, queen of Egypt (b. 77 BC)
- Lucretius, Roman philosopher (b. c. 99 BC)
- Quintus Caecilius Metellus Nepos, Roman consul
- Quintus Caecilius Metellus Nepos Iunior, Roman consul
- Tigranes the Great, Armenian Emperor (b. c. 140 BC)
