= 338 BC =

338 BC in various calendars
- Gregorian calendar: 338 BC; CCCXXXVIII BC
- Ab urbe condita: 416
- Ancient Egypt era: XXXI dynasty, 6
- Pharaoh: Arses of Persia, 1
- Ancient Greek Olympiad (summer): 110th Olympiad, year 3
- Assyrian calendar: 4413
- Balinese saka calendar: N/A
- Bengali calendar: −931 – −930
- Berber calendar: 613
- Buddhist calendar: 207
- Burmese calendar: −975
- Byzantine calendar: 5171–5172
- Chinese calendar: 壬午年 (Water Horse); 2360 or 2153 — to — 癸未年 (Water Goat); 2361 or 2154
- Coptic calendar: −621 – −620
- Discordian calendar: 829
- Ethiopian calendar: −345 – −344
- Hebrew calendar: 3423–3424
- Hindu calendars
- Vikram Samvat: −281 – −280
- Shaka Samvat: N/A
- Kali Yuga: 2763–2764
- Holocene calendar: 9663
- Iranian calendar: 959 BP – 958 BP
- Islamic calendar: 988 BH – 987 BH
- Javanese calendar: N/A
- Julian calendar: N/A
- Korean calendar: 1996
- Minguo calendar: 2249 before ROC 民前2249年
- Nanakshahi calendar: −1805
- Thai solar calendar: 205–206
- Tibetan calendar: ཆུ་ཕོ་རྟ་ལོ་ (male Water-Horse) −211 or −592 or −1364 — to — ཆུ་མོ་ལུག་ལོ་ (female Water-Sheep) −210 or −591 or −1363

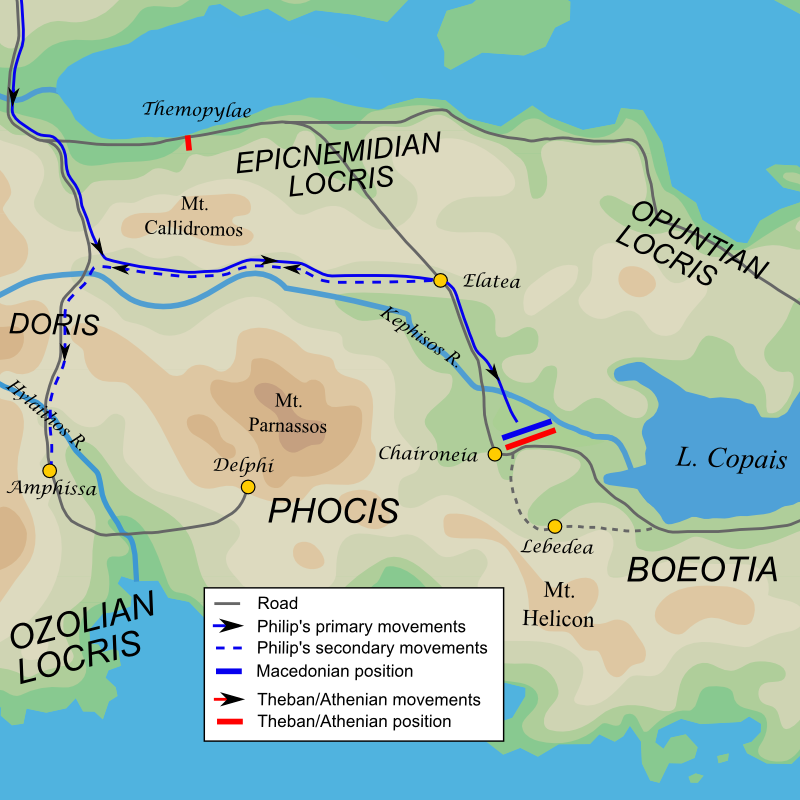
Philip II's campaign in 339–338 BC.

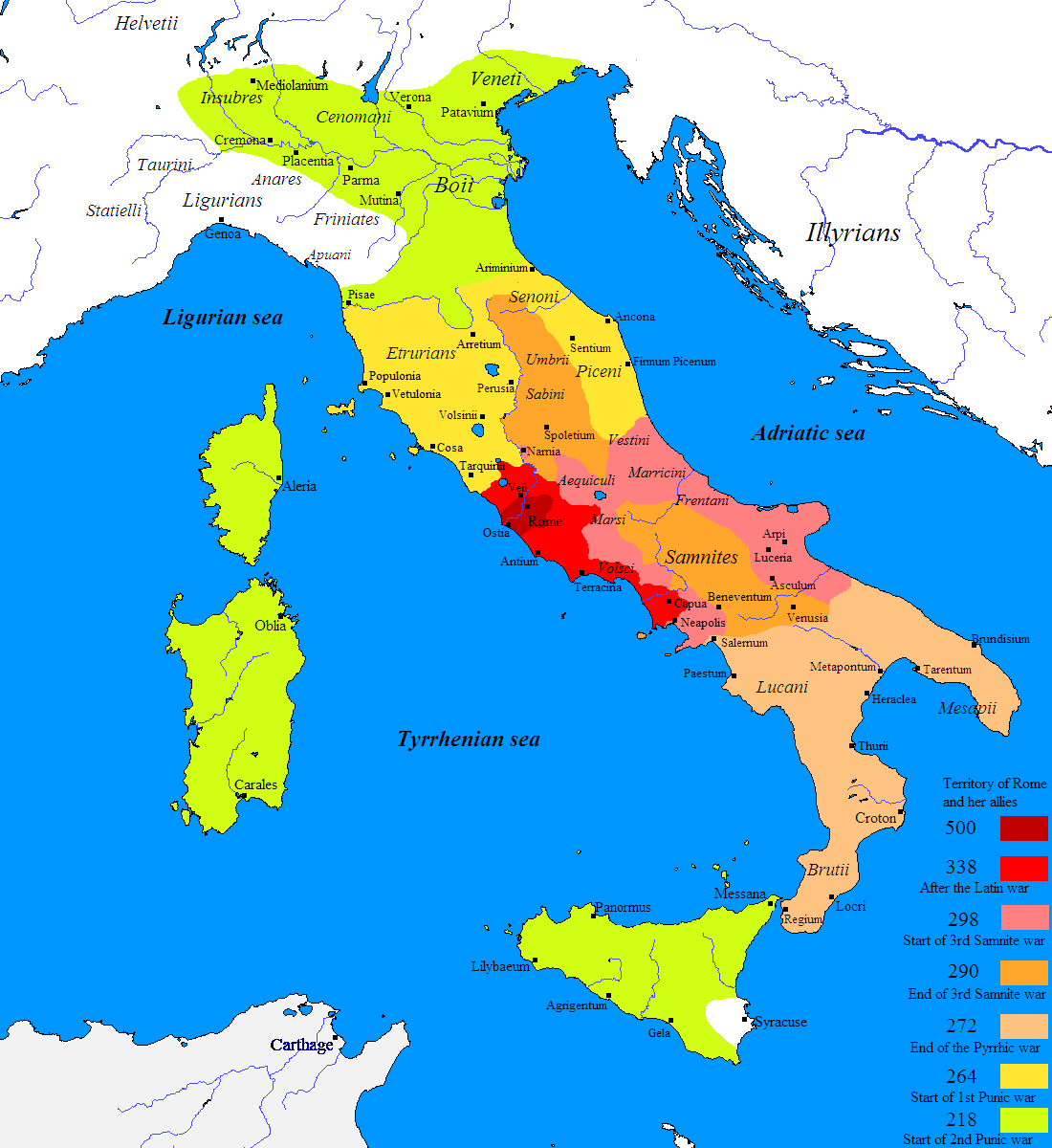
Roman expansion in Italy from 500 BC to 218 BC through the Latin War (light red), Samnite Wars (pink/orange), Pyrrhic War (beige), and First and Second Punic War (yellow and green). Roman Republic in 338 BC is marked with dark and light red.

Year 338 BC was a year of the pre-Julian Roman calendar. At the time it was known as the Year of the Consulship of Camillus and Maenius (or, less frequently, year 416 Ab urbe condita). The denomination 338 BC for this year has been used since the early medieval period, when the Anno Domini calendar era became the prevalent method in Europe for naming years.

== Events ==
=== By place ===
==== Persian Empire ====
- The Persian general and vizier, the eunuch Bagoas, falls out of favour with King Artaxerxes III. Bagoas seeks to remain in office by replacing Artaxerxes with his youngest son Arses, whom he thinks will be easier to control. So Bagoas murders Artaxerxes III and all his sons, other than Arses, who is then placed on the throne by Bagoas. Artaxerxes IV Arses is little more than a puppet-king while Bagoas acts as the power behind the throne.

==== Macedonia ====
- After his significant victory over the Locrians, Philip II of Macedon swiftly enters Phocis. He then turns southeast down the Cephissus valley, seizes Elateia and restores the fortifications of the city.
- Athens arranges an alliance with Euboea, Megara, Achaea, Corinth, Acarnania and some other states in the Peloponnesus. However, the most desirable ally for Athens is Thebes. Therefore, the Athenian leader, Demosthenes, goes to the Boeotian city and secures an alliance with Thebes despite the efforts of a Macedonian deputation to persuade Thebes to join with Macedonia. In return, Athens agrees to Thebes controlling Boeotia, Thebes being in command solely on land and jointly at sea, and Athens paying two thirds of the campaign's cost.
- August 2 – Philip II of Macedon defeats the Athenians and Thebans in the Battle of Chaeronea in western Boeotia. His son, Alexander, commands the left wing of the Macedonian army during the battle. In victory, Philip II is harsh on Thebes, but merciful on Athens, thanks to the efforts of the Athenian orator and diplomat, Demades, who helps negotiate a peace agreement between Macedonia and Athens.
- Philip II advances into Peloponnesus. He defeats Thessaly, subdues Sparta and summons a Pan-Hellenic Congress at Corinth. This results in the establishment of Macedonian hegemony over central Greece (including Athens).
- Philip II invaded and devastated much of Laconia, turning the Spartans out, though he did not seize Sparta itself.
- Athenian statesman and orator, Lycurgus, is given control of the state's finances and goes about doubling the annual public revenues.
- King Archidamus III of Sparta, after five years of campaigning in southern Italy, fails to achieve any decisive results and while leading a mercenary army to help Tarentum against the Lucanians, is killed with most of his troops at Manduria in Calabria.
- King Archidamus III is succeeded as the Eurypontid King of Sparta by his son, Agis III.

==== Sicily ====
- Carthage makes another effort to conquer all of Sicily. The Carthaginians dispatch some mercenaries to extend the conflict between Timoleon and the Sicilian tyrants. But this effort ends in the defeat of Hicetas, the tyrant of Leontini, who is taken prisoner and put to death. By a treaty between Syracuse and Carthage, the dominion of Carthage in Sicily is confined to the lands west of the Halycus (Platani) River.
- With peace finally achieved with Carthage, Timoleon of Syracuse is able to depose two more tyrants in Sicily and then retires into private life.

==== Roman Republic ====
- The Latin War ends with the Latin League being dissolved and the individual Latin cities having to accept Rome's terms. Many of the cities are incorporated into the Roman state. In making peace with the cities of the defeated Latin League, Rome offers liberal terms. The men of many of these cities are granted citizenship and, as a result, Rome gains friends rather than enemies.
- With the fall of their chief city, Antium, to the Romans, the Volsci finally abandon their resistance against the Romans and accept an alliance with Rome.

== Births ==
- Xuan, Chinese queen dowager of Chu (d. 265 BC)

== Deaths ==
- Artaxerxes III, king of Persia (murdered) (b. c. 425 BC)
- Archidamus III, king of Sparta (killed in battle)
- Isocrates, Athenian orator and rhetorician (b. 436 BC)
- Shang Yang, Chinese statesman of Qin (b. 390 BC)
- Xiao of Qin, Chinese duke of Qin (b. 381 BC)
