= 77 BC =

77 BC in various calendars
- Gregorian calendar: 77 BC; LXXVII BC
- Ab urbe condita: 677
- Ancient Egypt era: XXXIII dynasty, 247
- Pharaoh: Ptolemy XII Auletes, 4
- Ancient Greek Olympiad (summer): 175th Olympiad, year 4
- Assyrian calendar: 4674
- Balinese saka calendar: N/A
- Bengali calendar: −670 – −669
- Berber calendar: 874
- Buddhist calendar: 468
- Burmese calendar: −714
- Byzantine calendar: 5432–5433
- Chinese calendar: 癸卯年 (Water Rabbit); 2621 or 2414 — to — 甲辰年 (Wood Dragon); 2622 or 2415
- Coptic calendar: −360 – −359
- Discordian calendar: 1090
- Ethiopian calendar: −84 – −83
- Hebrew calendar: 3684–3685
- Hindu calendars
- Vikram Samvat: −20 – −19
- Shaka Samvat: N/A
- Kali Yuga: 3024–3025
- Holocene calendar: 9924
- Iranian calendar: 698 BP – 697 BP
- Islamic calendar: 719 BH – 718 BH
- Javanese calendar: N/A
- Julian calendar: N/A
- Korean calendar: 2257
- Minguo calendar: 1988 before ROC 民前1988年
- Nanakshahi calendar: −1544
- Seleucid era: 235/236 AG
- Thai solar calendar: 466–467
- Tibetan calendar: ཆུ་མོ་ཡོས་ལོ་ (female Water-Hare); 50 or −331 or −1103 — to — ཤིང་ཕོ་འབྲུག་ལོ་ (male Wood-Dragon); 51 or −330 or −1102

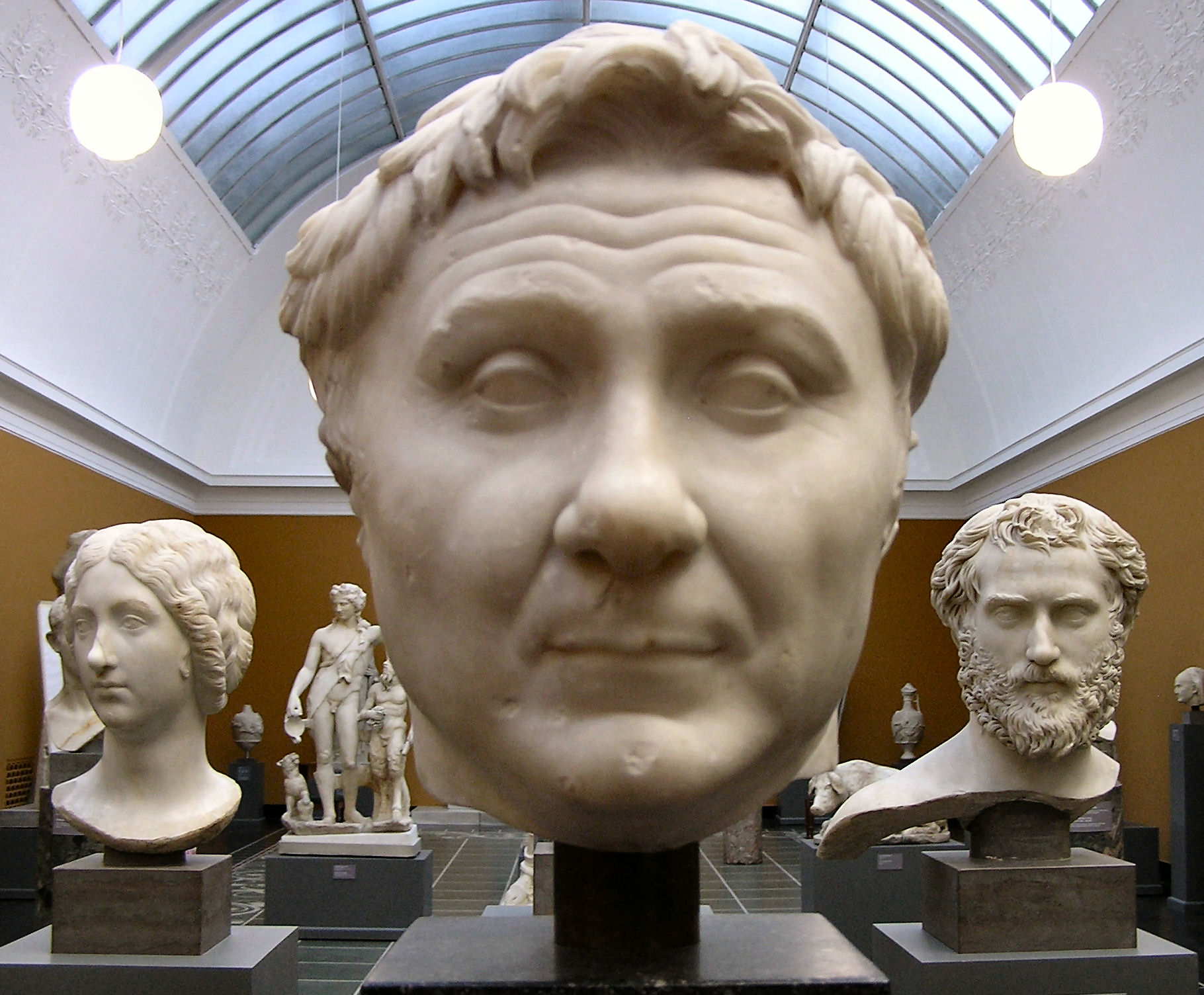
Bust of Gnaeus Pompeius (middle).

Year 77 BC was a year of the pre-Julian Roman calendar. At the time it was known as the Year of the Consulship of Brutus and Lepidus (or less frequently, year 677 AUC). The denomination 77 BC for this year has been used since the early medieval period, when the Anno Domini calendar era became the prevalent method in Europe for naming years.

== Events ==
=== By place ===
==== Roman Republic ====
- Marcus Aemilius Lepidus, Roman proconsul of Transalpine Gaul and leader of the Populares faction in the senate, is defeated by Quintus Lutatius Catulus at the Milvian bridge outside Rome. The remnants of the rebels are wiped out by Pompey in Etruria.
- Lepidus, with some 21,000 troops, manages to escape to Sardinia. Soon afterwards he becomes ill and dies, his battered army, now under command by Marcus Perperna Vento, sails on to the Iberian Peninsula.
- Pompeius marches along the Via Domitia through Gallia Narbonensis crossing the Pyrenees to Spain. He joins with Quintus Metellus Pius to suppress the revolt of Quintus Sertorius, but is at first unsuccessful.

==== Armenia ====
- The city of Tigranakert of Artsakh is built.

== Births ==
- Berenice IV Epiphaneia, Greek princess and queen of the Ptolemaic Kingdom (d. 55 BC)
- Liu Xiang, Chinese scholar, editor of the Shan Hai Jing, compilator of the Lienü zhuan, and father of Liu Xin (d. 6 BC)

== Deaths ==
- Marcus Aemilius Lepidus, Roman statesman and consul (b. 120 BC)
- Tian Qianqiu, Chinese politician and prime minister
- Titus Quinctius Atta, Roman comedy writer
- Vattagamani Abhaya, king of Sri Lanka
