= 275 BC =

275 BC in various calendars
Gregorian calendar	275 BC; CCLXXV BC
Ab urbe condita	479
Ancient Egypt era	XXXIII dynasty, 49
Pharaoh	Ptolemy II Philadelphus, 9
Ancient Greek Olympiad (summer)	126th Olympiad, year 2
Assyrian calendar	4476
Balinese saka calendar	N/A
Bengali calendar	−868 – −867
Berber calendar	676
Buddhist calendar	270
Burmese calendar	−912
Byzantine calendar	5234–5235
Chinese calendar	乙酉年 (Wood Rooster); 2423 or 2216 — to — 丙戌年 (Fire Dog); 2424 or 2217
Coptic calendar	−558 – −557
Discordian calendar	892
Ethiopian calendar	−282 – −281
Hebrew calendar	3486–3487
- Hindu calendars
Vikram Samvat	−218 – −217
Shaka Samvat	N/A
Kali Yuga	2826–2827
Holocene calendar	9726
Iranian calendar	896 BP – 895 BP
Islamic calendar	924 BH – 923 BH
Javanese calendar	N/A
Julian calendar	N/A
Korean calendar	2059
Minguo calendar	2186 before ROC 民前2186年
Nanakshahi calendar	−1742
Seleucid era	37/38 AG
Thai solar calendar	268–269
Tibetan calendar	阴木鸡年 (female Wood-Rooster) −148 or −529 or −1301 — to — 阳火狗年 (male Fire-Dog) −147 or −528 or −1300

Year 275 BC was a year of the pre-Julian Roman calendar. At the time it was known as the Year of the Consulship of Dentatus and Caudinus (or, less frequently, year 479 Ab urbe condita). The denomination 275 BC for this year has been used since the early medieval period, when the Anno Domini calendar era became the prevalent method in Europe for naming years.

== Events ==
=== By place ===
==== Egypt ====
- The Museum of Alexandria is founded by the Egyptian King Ptolemy II.

==== Roman Republic ====
- When Pyrrhus returns from Sicily, he finds himself vastly outnumbered by a superior Roman army under the command of consul Manius Curius Dentatus. After the inconclusive Battle of Beneventum, Roman commander and statesman, Gaius Fabricius Luscinus, negotiates a peace with Pyrrhus, after which Pyrrhus decides to end his campaign in Italy and return to Epirus, which results in the loss of all his Italian holdings.

==== Sicily ====
- Following the departure of Pyrrhus from Sicily, the Syracusan army and the city's citizens appoint Hiero II as the commander of their slaves. He strengthens his position by marrying the daughter of Leptines, the city's leading citizen.

==== Greece ====
- Antiochus's alliance with Antigonus II, now fully in possession of Macedonia, is cemented by Antigonus's marriage to Phila, Antiochus's half sister.

==== China ====
- General Bai Qi of the State of Qin brings order to the rebellious provinces of Wu and Qianzhong, which had been formed from the territories conquered from the State of Chu between 280 and 278 BC.
- General Lian Po of the State of Zhou invades the State of Wei and captures the cities of Fangling and Anyang.

== Births ==
- Hamilcar Barca, Carthaginian general, statesman and father of Hannibal (approximate date)
- Quintus Fabius Maximus Verrucosus, Roman dictator, politician and leader (approximate date)

== Deaths ==
- Shen Dao, Chinese philosopher from Zhao who also served at the Jixia academy in Qi. He is known for his blend of Legalism and Taoism (approximate date)
