= 265 BC =

265 BC in various calendars
- Gregorian calendar: 265 BC; CCLXV BC
- Ab urbe condita: 489
- Ancient Egypt era: XXXIII dynasty, 59
- Pharaoh: Ptolemy II Philadelphus, 19
- Ancient Greek Olympiad (summer): 128th Olympiad, year 4
- Assyrian calendar: 4486
- Balinese saka calendar: N/A
- Bengali calendar: −858 – −857
- Berber calendar: 686
- Buddhist calendar: 280
- Burmese calendar: −902
- Byzantine calendar: 5244–5245
- Chinese calendar: 乙未年 (Wood Goat); 2433 or 2226 — to — 丙申年 (Fire Monkey); 2434 or 2227
- Coptic calendar: −548 – −547
- Discordian calendar: 902
- Ethiopian calendar: −272 – −271
- Hebrew calendar: 3496–3497
- Hindu calendars
- Vikram Samvat: −208 – −207
- Shaka Samvat: N/A
- Kali Yuga: 2836–2837
- Holocene calendar: 9736
- Iranian calendar: 886 BP – 885 BP
- Islamic calendar: 913 BH – 912 BH
- Javanese calendar: N/A
- Julian calendar: N/A
- Korean calendar: 2069
- Minguo calendar: 2176 before ROC 民前2176年
- Nanakshahi calendar: −1732
- Seleucid era: 47/48 AG
- Thai solar calendar: 278–279
- Tibetan calendar: ཤིང་མོ་ལུག་ལོ་ (female Wood-Sheep) −138 or −519 or −1291 — to — མེ་ཕོ་སྤྲེ་ལོ་ (male Fire-Monkey) −137 or −518 or −1290

Year 265 BC was a year of the pre-Julian Roman calendar. At the time it was known as the Year of the Consulship of Gurges and Vitulus (or, less frequently, year 489 Ab urbe condita). The denomination 265 BC for this year has been used since the early medieval period, when the Anno Domini calendar era became the prevalent method in Europe for naming years.

== Events ==
=== By place ===
==== Greece ====
- Although the Egyptian fleet blockades the Saronic Gulf, the Macedonian King Antigonus II defeats the Spartans and kills the king of Sparta, Areus I near Corinth, after which he besieges Athens.
- Acrotatus II succeeds his father Areus I as king of Sparta.

==== Italy ====
- Hiero II threatens to renew his attack on the Mamertines. They appeal to Carthage and receive the support of a Carthaginian garrison. The Mamertines also appeal to the Romans who are also willing to help.
- The Battle of Messana (265-264 BCE) takes place as the first military clash between the Roman Republic and Carthage.
- The Etruscan city of Volsinii is brought under Roman control. During a siege, the consul Quintus Fabius Maximus Gurges is killed.

==== China ====
- The State of Zhao stations general Li Mu in Yanmen Commandery, where he proceeds to win multiple victories over the Xiongnu.

=== By topic ===
==== Arts & sciences ====
- The Archimedes screw for raising water is devised by the Greek mathematician Archimedes, who is studying at Alexandria.

== Births ==
- Agis IV, king of Sparta (approximate date)
- Ziaelas, king of Bithynia (approximate date)

== Deaths ==
- Alexinus, Greek philosopher of Elis
- Areus I, king of Sparta (killed in battle)
- Quintus Fabius Maximus Gurges, Roman consul
- Xiang of Qi, Chinese king of Qi (Warring States Period)
- Xuan, Chinese queen dowager of Chu (b. 338 BC)
