= 541 BC =

541 BC in various calendars
- Gregorian calendar: 541 BC; DXLI BC
- Ab urbe condita: 213
- Ancient Egypt era: XXVI dynasty, 124
- Pharaoh: Amasis II, 30
- Ancient Greek Olympiad (summer): 59th Olympiad, year 4
- Assyrian calendar: 4210
- Balinese saka calendar: N/A
- Bengali calendar: −1134 – −1133
- Berber calendar: 410
- Buddhist calendar: 4
- Burmese calendar: −1178
- Byzantine calendar: 4968–4969
- Chinese calendar: 己未年 (Earth Goat); 2157 or 1950 — to — 庚申年 (Metal Monkey); 2158 or 1951
- Coptic calendar: −824 – −823
- Discordian calendar: 626
- Ethiopian calendar: −548 – −547
- Hebrew calendar: 3220–3221
- Hindu calendars
- Vikram Samvat: −484 – −483
- Shaka Samvat: N/A
- Kali Yuga: 2560–2561
- Holocene calendar: 9460
- Iranian calendar: 1162 BP – 1161 BP
- Islamic calendar: 1198 BH – 1197 BH
- Javanese calendar: N/A
- Julian calendar: N/A
- Korean calendar: 1793
- Minguo calendar: 2452 before ROC 民前2452年
- Nanakshahi calendar: −2008
- Thai solar calendar: 2–3
- Tibetan calendar: ས་མོ་ལུག་ལོ་ (female Earth-Sheep) −414 or −795 or −1567 — to — ལྕགས་ཕོ་སྤྲེ་ལོ་ (male Iron-Monkey) −413 or −794 or −1566

The year 541 BC was a year of the pre-Julian Roman calendar. In the Roman Empire, it was known as year 213 Ab urbe condita. The denomination 541 BC for this year has been used since the early medieval period, when the Anno Domini calendar era became the prevalent method in Europe for naming years.

== Deaths ==
- Jia'ao, Chinese king of Chu
