= 188 BC =

188 BC in various calendars
- Gregorian calendar: 188 BC; CLXXXVIII BC
- Ab urbe condita: 566
- Ancient Egypt era: XXXIII dynasty, 136
- Pharaoh: Ptolemy V Epiphanes, 16
- Ancient Greek Olympiad (summer): 148th Olympiad (victor)¹
- Assyrian calendar: 4563
- Balinese saka calendar: N/A
- Bengali calendar: −781 – −780
- Berber calendar: 763
- Buddhist calendar: 357
- Burmese calendar: −825
- Byzantine calendar: 5321–5322
- Chinese calendar: 壬子年 (Water Rat); 2510 or 2303 — to — 癸丑年 (Water Ox); 2511 or 2304
- Coptic calendar: −471 – −470
- Discordian calendar: 979
- Ethiopian calendar: −195 – −194
- Hebrew calendar: 3573–3574
- Hindu calendars
- Vikram Samvat: −131 – −130
- Shaka Samvat: N/A
- Kali Yuga: 2913–2914
- Holocene calendar: 9813
- Iranian calendar: 809 BP – 808 BP
- Islamic calendar: 834 BH – 833 BH
- Javanese calendar: N/A
- Julian calendar: N/A
- Korean calendar: 2146
- Minguo calendar: 2099 before ROC 民前2099年
- Nanakshahi calendar: −1655
- Seleucid era: 124/125 AG
- Thai solar calendar: 355–356
- Tibetan calendar: ཆུ་ཕོ་བྱི་བ་ལོ་ (male Water-Rat) −61 or −442 or −1214 — to — ཆུ་མོ་གླང་ལོ་ (female Water-Ox) −60 or −441 or −1213

Year 188 BC was a year of the pre-Julian Roman calendar. At the time it was known as the Year of the Consulship of Messalla and Salinator (or, less frequently, year 566 Ab urbe condita). The denomination 188 BC for this year has been used since the early medieval period, when the Anno Domini calendar era became the prevalent method in Europe for naming years.

== Events ==
=== By place ===
==== Greece ====
- The leader of the Achaean League, Philopoemen, enters northern Laconia with his army and a group of Spartan exiles. His army demolishes the wall that the former tyrant of Sparta, Nabis, has built around Sparta. Philopoemen then restores Spartan citizenship to the exiles and abolishes Spartan law, introducing Achaean law in its place. Sparta's role as a major power in Greece ends, while the Achaean League becomes the dominant power throughout the Peloponnese.

==== Roman Republic ====
- The continuing quarrels among the Greek cities and leagues increases the conviction in Rome that there will be no peace in Greece until Rome takes full control.
- Through the peace treaty of Apamea (in Phrygia), the Romans force the Seleucid king, Antiochus III, to surrender all his Greek and Anatolian possessions as far east as the Taurus Mountains, to pay 15,000 talents over a period of 12 years and to surrender to Rome the former Carthaginian general Hannibal, his elephants and his fleet, and furnish hostages, including the king's eldest son, Demetrius. Rome is now the master of the eastern Mediterranean while Antiochus III's empire is reduced to Syria, Mesopotamia, and western Iran.

==== Asia Minor ====
- Hannibal flees via Crete to the court of King Prusias I of Bithynia who is engaged in warfare with Rome's ally, King Eumenes II of Pergamum.
- Following the peace of Apamea, Eumenes II receives the provinces of Phrygia, Lydia, Lycia, Pisidia, and Pamphylia from his Roman allies, as the Romans have no desire to actually administer territory in Hellenistic Anatolia but want to see a strong, friendly state in Anatolia as a buffer zone against any possible Seleucid expansion in the future.

==== China ====
- Following the death of Emperor Hui of Han, his mother Empress Lü makes Hui's son Emperor Qianshao of Han and appoints members of her clan as kings, thereby establishing her effective control over China.

== Births ==
- Jing of Han, emperor of the Chinese Han dynasty, who ruled from 157 BC (d. 141 BC)

== Deaths ==
- Hui of Han, the second emperor of the Chinese Han dynasty, who ruled from 195 BC (b. 210 BC)
