= 187 BC =

187 BC in various calendars
- Gregorian calendar: 187 BC; CLXXXVII BC
- Ab urbe condita: 567
- Ancient Egypt era: XXXIII dynasty, 137
- Pharaoh: Ptolemy V Epiphanes, 17
- Ancient Greek Olympiad (summer): 148th Olympiad, year 2
- Assyrian calendar: 4564
- Balinese saka calendar: N/A
- Bengali calendar: −780 – −779
- Berber calendar: 764
- Buddhist calendar: 358
- Burmese calendar: −824
- Byzantine calendar: 5322–5323
- Chinese calendar: 癸丑年 (Water Ox); 2511 or 2304 — to — 甲寅年 (Wood Tiger); 2512 or 2305
- Coptic calendar: −470 – −469
- Discordian calendar: 980
- Ethiopian calendar: −194 – −193
- Hebrew calendar: 3574–3575
- Hindu calendars
- Vikram Samvat: −130 – −129
- Shaka Samvat: N/A
- Kali Yuga: 2914–2915
- Holocene calendar: 9814
- Iranian calendar: 808 BP – 807 BP
- Islamic calendar: 833 BH – 832 BH
- Javanese calendar: N/A
- Julian calendar: N/A
- Korean calendar: 2147
- Minguo calendar: 2098 before ROC 民前2098年
- Nanakshahi calendar: −1654
- Seleucid era: 125/126 AG
- Thai solar calendar: 356–357
- Tibetan calendar: ཆུ་མོ་གླང་ལོ་ (female Water-Ox) −60 or −441 or −1213 — to — ཤིང་ཕོ་སྟག་ལོ་ (male Wood-Tiger) −59 or −440 or −1212

Year 187 BC was a year of the pre-Julian Roman calendar. At the time it was known as the Year of the Consulship of Lepidus and Flaminius (or, less frequently, year 567 Ab urbe condita). The denomination 187 BC for this year has been used since the early medieval period, when the Anno Domini calendar era became the prevalent method in Europe for naming years.

== Events ==
=== By place ===
==== Seleucid Empire ====
- The Seleucid king, Antiochus III, attempts to collect tribute from a temple near Susa, Persia, where he was killed. He is succeeded by his son, Seleucus IV, who inherits an empire consisting of Syria, Mesopotamia, Babylonia, western Iran.

==== Roman Republic ====
- Tiberius Sempronius Gracchus is elected tribune of the plebs, in which capacity he is recorded as having saved Scipio Africanus from prosecution by interposing his veto. Tiberius is no friend nor political ally of Scipio's, but feels that the general's services to Rome merit his release from the threat of trial like any common criminal. Supposedly, in gratitude for this action, Scipio betrothes his youngest daughter, Cornelia, to him.
- The construction of the Via Aemilia, a trunk road in the north Italian plains, running from Ariminum (Rimini), on the Adriatic coast, to Placentia (Piacenza) on the river Padus (Po), is completed.

==== Egypt ====
- Queen Cleopatra I is appointed Vizier (Chief Minister) to the King Ptolemy V Epiphanes.

== Births ==
- Demetrius I Soter, king of Syria (approximate year)

== Deaths ==
- Antiochus III the Great, Seleucid king of the Hellenistic Syrian Empire from 223 BC (b. c. 241 BC)
