= 254 BC =

254 BC in various calendars
Gregorian calendar	254 BC; CCLIV BC
Ab urbe condita	500
Ancient Egypt era	XXXIII dynasty, 70
Pharaoh	Ptolemy II Philadelphus, 30
Ancient Greek Olympiad (summer)	131st Olympiad, year 3
Assyrian calendar	4497
Balinese saka calendar	N/A
Bengali calendar	−847 – −846
Berber calendar	697
Buddhist calendar	291
Burmese calendar	−891
Byzantine calendar	5255–5256
Chinese calendar	丙午年 (Fire Horse); 2444 or 2237 — to — 丁未年 (Fire Goat); 2445 or 2238
Coptic calendar	−537 – −536
Discordian calendar	913
Ethiopian calendar	−261 – −260
Hebrew calendar	3507–3508
- Hindu calendars
Vikram Samvat	−197 – −196
Shaka Samvat	N/A
Kali Yuga	2847–2848
Holocene calendar	9747
Iranian calendar	875 BP – 874 BP
Islamic calendar	902 BH – 901 BH
Javanese calendar	N/A
Julian calendar	N/A
Korean calendar	2080
Minguo calendar	2165 before ROC 民前2165年
Nanakshahi calendar	−1721
Seleucid era	58/59 AG
Thai solar calendar	289–290
Tibetan calendar	阳火马年 (male Fire-Horse) −127 or −508 or −1280 — to — 阴火羊年 (female Fire-Goat) −126 or −507 or −1279

Year 254 BC was a year of the pre-Julian Roman calendar. At the time it was known as the Year of the Consulship of Asina and Calatinus (or, less frequently, year 500 Ab urbe condita). The denomination 254 BC for this year has been used since the early medieval period, when the Anno Domini calendar era became the prevalent method in Europe for naming years.

== Events ==
=== By place ===
==== Roman Republic ====
- A Roman army led by consuls Gnaeus Cornelius Scipio Asina and Aulus Atilius Calatinus capture Panormus in Sicily.
- The Romans lose control of the Sicilian city of Agrigentum to the Carthaginians.

== Births ==
- Marcus Livius Salinator, Roman consul and commander during the Second Punic War
- Titus Macchius Plautus, Roman playwright who is credited with forming the foundations of modern comedy (d. 184 BC)

== Deaths ==
- Areus II, Agiad king of Sparta (son of Acrotatus II)
