= 226 BC =

226 BC in various calendars
- Gregorian calendar: 226 BC; CCXXVI BC
- Ab urbe condita: 528
- Ancient Egypt era: XXXIII dynasty, 98
- Pharaoh: Ptolemy III Euergetes, 21
- Ancient Greek Olympiad (summer): 138th Olympiad, year 3
- Assyrian calendar: 4525
- Balinese saka calendar: N/A
- Bengali calendar: −819 – −818
- Berber calendar: 725
- Buddhist calendar: 319
- Burmese calendar: −863
- Byzantine calendar: 5283–5284
- Chinese calendar: 甲戌年 (Wood Dog); 2472 or 2265 — to — 乙亥年 (Wood Pig); 2473 or 2266
- Coptic calendar: −509 – −508
- Discordian calendar: 941
- Ethiopian calendar: −233 – −232
- Hebrew calendar: 3535–3536
- Hindu calendars
- Vikram Samvat: −169 – −168
- Shaka Samvat: N/A
- Kali Yuga: 2875–2876
- Holocene calendar: 9775
- Iranian calendar: 847 BP – 846 BP
- Islamic calendar: 873 BH – 872 BH
- Javanese calendar: N/A
- Julian calendar: N/A
- Korean calendar: 2108
- Minguo calendar: 2137 before ROC 民前2137年
- Nanakshahi calendar: −1693
- Seleucid era: 86/87 AG
- Thai solar calendar: 317–318
- Tibetan calendar: ཤིང་ཕོ་ཁྱི་ལོ་ (male Wood-Dog) −99 or −480 or −1252 — to — ཤིང་མོ་ཕག་ལོ་ (female Wood-Boar) −98 or −479 or −1251

Year 226 BC was a year of the pre-Julian Roman calendar. At the time it was known as the Year of the Consulship of Messalla and Fullo (or, less frequently, year 528 Ab urbe condita). The denomination 226 BC for this year has been used since the early medieval period, when the Anno Domini calendar era became the prevalent method in Europe for naming years.

== Events ==
=== By place ===
==== Greece ====
- An earthquake destroys the city of Camirus and the Colossus of Rhodes on the island of Rhodes.
- The Spartan King Cleomenes III captures Mantinea and defeats the Achaean League under Aratus of Sicyon at Hecatombaeum, near Dyme in north-eastern Elis.

==== Roman Republic ====
- A formidable host of Gauls, some of them from across the Alps, threaten Rome.
- The Greek merchants of Massilia, frightened by Carthaginian successes in Spain (including their exploitation of the Spanish silver mines), appeal to Rome. Rome makes an alliance with the independent Spanish port city of Saguntum south of the Ebro River.
- The Romans send an embassy to Hasdrubal and conclude the Ebro Treaty which prohibits him from waging war north of the river Ebro, but allowing him a free hand to the south even at the expense of the interests of the town of Massilia.

==== Seleucid Empire ====
- Antiochus Hierax, brother of the Seleucid King Seleucus II manages to escape from captivity in Thrace and flees to the mountains to raise an army, but he is killed by a band of Galatians.
- Seleucus II dies after a fall from his horse and is succeeded by his eldest son Seleucus III Soter. At the time of Seleucus II's death, the empire of the Seleucids, with its capital at Antioch on the Orontes River, stretches from the Aegean Sea to the borders of India and includes southern Anatolia, Mesopotamia, Persia, and northern Syria. Dynastic power is upheld by a mercenary army and by the loyalty of many Greek cities founded by Alexander the Great and his successors. The strength of the empire is already being sapped by repeated revolts in its eastern provinces and dissention amongst the members of the Seleucid dynasty.

==== China ====
- The Qin generals Wang Jian, Li Xin and Wang Ben conquer western Yan and its capital Ji. To secure peace, king Xi of Yan executes his son Crown Prince Dan, who is wanted for the attempted assassination of the king of Qin, Ying Zheng.
- Lord Changping defects from the State of Qin and returns to his motherland in Chu.
- That same year, ex-Han nobility launched a failed rebellion against the Qin Forces. But in the end they were crushed.

== Deaths ==
- Antiochus Hierax, younger brother of Seleucus II, who has fought with him over the control of the Seleucid dominions in the Middle East (b. c. 263 BC)
- Lydiadas of Megalopolis
- Seleucus II Callinicus, king of the Seleucid kingdom from 246 BC
