= 352 BC =

352 BC in various calendars
- Gregorian calendar: 352 BC; CCCLII BC
- Ab urbe condita: 402
- Ancient Egypt era: XXX dynasty, 29
- Pharaoh: Nectanebo II, 9
- Ancient Greek Olympiad (summer): 107th Olympiad (victor)¹
- Assyrian calendar: 4399
- Balinese saka calendar: N/A
- Bengali calendar: −945 – −944
- Berber calendar: 599
- Buddhist calendar: 193
- Burmese calendar: −989
- Byzantine calendar: 5157–5158
- Chinese calendar: 戊辰年 (Earth Dragon); 2346 or 2139 — to — 己巳年 (Earth Snake); 2347 or 2140
- Coptic calendar: −635 – −634
- Discordian calendar: 815
- Ethiopian calendar: −359 – −358
- Hebrew calendar: 3409–3410
- Hindu calendars
- Vikram Samvat: −295 – −294
- Shaka Samvat: N/A
- Kali Yuga: 2749–2750
- Holocene calendar: 9649
- Iranian calendar: 973 BP – 972 BP
- Islamic calendar: 1003 BH – 1002 BH
- Javanese calendar: N/A
- Julian calendar: N/A
- Korean calendar: 1982
- Minguo calendar: 2263 before ROC 民前2263年
- Nanakshahi calendar: −1819
- Thai solar calendar: 191–192
- Tibetan calendar: ས་ཕོ་འབྲུག་ལོ་ (male Earth-Dragon) −225 or −606 or −1378 — to — ས་མོ་སྦྲུལ་ལོ་ (female Earth-Snake) −224 or −605 or −1377

Year 352 BC was a year of the pre-Julian Roman calendar. At the time it was known as the Year of the Consulship of Poplicola and Rutilus (or, less frequently, year 402 Ab urbe condita). The denomination 352 BC for this year has been used since the early medieval period, when the Anno Domini calendar era became the prevalent method in Europe for naming years.

== Events ==
=== By place ===
==== Greece ====
- After two initial efforts, Philip II of Macedon drives the Phocians south after a major victory over them in the Battle of Crocus Field. Athens and Sparta come to the assistance of the Phocians and Philip is checked at Thermopylae. Philip does not attempt to advance into central Greece with the Athenians occupying this pass. With this victory, Philip accrues great glory as the righteous avenger of Apollo, since the Phocian general Onomarchos has plundered the sacred treasury of Delphi to pay his mercenaries. Onomarchos' body is crucified, and the prisoners are drowned as ritual demanded for temple-robbers.
- Philip then moves against Thrace. He makes a successful expedition into Thrace, gaining a firm ascendancy in the country, and brings away a son of Cersobleptes, the King of Thrace, as a hostage. Philip II's Thessalian victory earns him election as president (archon) of the Thessalian League.

==== Rome ====
- Consuls: Publio Valerio Publicola & Gaius Marcius Rutilus
- Dictator: Gaius Julius Iulus

== Births ==
- Thessalonica, queen of Macedonian dynasty, sister of Alexandrus the Great
