= 223 BC =

223 BC in various calendars
Gregorian calendar	223 BC; CCXXIII BC
Ab urbe condita	531
Ancient Egypt era	XXXIII dynasty, 101
Pharaoh	Ptolemy III Euergetes, 24
Ancient Greek Olympiad (summer)	139th Olympiad, year 2
Assyrian calendar	4528
Balinese saka calendar	N/A
Bengali calendar	−816 – −815
Berber calendar	728
Buddhist calendar	322
Burmese calendar	−860
Byzantine calendar	5286–5287
Chinese calendar	丁丑年 (Fire Ox); 2475 or 2268 — to — 戊寅年 (Earth Tiger); 2476 or 2269
Coptic calendar	−506 – −505
Discordian calendar	944
Ethiopian calendar	−230 – −229
Hebrew calendar	3538–3539
- Hindu calendars
Vikram Samvat	−166 – −165
Shaka Samvat	N/A
Kali Yuga	2878–2879
Holocene calendar	9778
Iranian calendar	844 BP – 843 BP
Islamic calendar	870 BH – 869 BH
Javanese calendar	N/A
Julian calendar	N/A
Korean calendar	2111
Minguo calendar	2134 before ROC 民前2134年
Nanakshahi calendar	−1690
Seleucid era	89/90 AG
Thai solar calendar	320–321
Tibetan calendar	阴火牛年 (female Fire-Ox) −96 or −477 or −1249 — to — 阳土虎年 (male Earth-Tiger) −95 or −476 or −1248

Year 223 BC was a year of the pre-Julian Roman calendar. At the time it was known as the Year of the Consulship of Flaminius and Philus (or, less frequently, year 531 Ab urbe condita). The denomination 223 BC for this year has been used since the early medieval period, when the Anno Domini calendar era became the prevalent method in Europe for naming years.

== Events ==
=== By place ===
==== Seleucid Empire ====
- The Seleucid king Seleucus III is assassinated by members of his army while on campaign against Attalus of Pergamon in Phrygia.
- Seleucus III is succeeded by his younger brother, Antiochus III.

==== Roman Republic ====
- Gaius Flaminius is elected consul for the first time and, with his co-consul Publius Furius Philus, he forces the Gauls south of the Alps to submit to Rome, creating the province of Cisalpine Gaul.

==== Greece ====
- The Spartan king Cleomenes III destroys and burns the city of Megalopolis but the inhabitants are saved by Philopoemen who leads the defence of the city until the inhabitants can escape.
- The king of Macedonia, Antigonus III Doson, restores Macedonian influence in the Peloponnese for the first time in almost two decades. After signing alliances with the Achaeans, Boeotians, Thessalians and the Acarnanians, Antigonus invades the Peloponnese and drives the Spartans out of Argos, taking Orchomenus and Mantineia in the process.

==== Bactria ====
- King Diodotus II of Bactria is killed by a usurper, Euthydemus I, founder of the Greco-Bactrian Euthydemid dynasty.

==== China ====
- The Qin generals Wang Jian and Meng Wu defeat the Chu general Xiang Yan and the king of Chu, Lord Changping. Lord Changping is killed, and Xiang Yan commits suicide soon afterwards.

== Deaths ==
- Lord Changping, the last king of Chu, one of the Seven Warring States in ancient China.
- Diodotus II, King of Bactria, the son and successor of Diodotus I (approximate date) (b. c. 252 BC)
- Seleucus III, king of the Seleucid dynasty from 226 BC (assassinated) (b. c. 243 BC)
