= 244 BC =

244 BC in various calendars
- Gregorian calendar: 244 BC; CCXLIV BC
- Ab urbe condita: 510
- Ancient Egypt era: XXXIII dynasty, 80
- Pharaoh: Ptolemy III Euergetes, 3
- Ancient Greek Olympiad (summer): 134th Olympiad (victor)¹
- Assyrian calendar: 4507
- Balinese saka calendar: N/A
- Bengali calendar: −837 – −836
- Berber calendar: 707
- Buddhist calendar: 301
- Burmese calendar: −881
- Byzantine calendar: 5265–5266
- Chinese calendar: 丙辰年 (Fire Dragon); 2454 or 2247 — to — 丁巳年 (Fire Snake); 2455 or 2248
- Coptic calendar: −527 – −526
- Discordian calendar: 923
- Ethiopian calendar: −251 – −250
- Hebrew calendar: 3517–3518
- Hindu calendars
- Vikram Samvat: −187 – −186
- Shaka Samvat: N/A
- Kali Yuga: 2857–2858
- Holocene calendar: 9757
- Iranian calendar: 865 BP – 864 BP
- Islamic calendar: 892 BH – 891 BH
- Javanese calendar: N/A
- Julian calendar: N/A
- Korean calendar: 2090
- Minguo calendar: 2155 before ROC 民前2155年
- Nanakshahi calendar: −1711
- Seleucid era: 68/69 AG
- Thai solar calendar: 299–300
- Tibetan calendar: མེ་ཕོ་འབྲུག་ལོ་ (male Fire-Dragon) −117 or −498 or −1270 — to — མེ་མོ་སྦྲུལ་ལོ་ (female Fire-Snake) −116 or −497 or −1269

Year 244 BC was a year of the pre-Julian Roman calendar. At the time it was known as the Year of the Consulship of Atticus and Blaesus (or, less frequently, year 510 Ab urbe condita). The denomination 244 BC for this year has been used since the early medieval period, when the Anno Domini calendar era became the prevalent method in Europe for naming years.

== Events ==
=== By place ===
==== Greece ====
- Agis IV succeeds his father, Eudamidas II, as Eurypontid king of Sparta.
- The war in Asia Minor and the Aegean Sea intensifies as the Achaean League allies itself to Ptolemy III Euergetes of Egypt, while Seleucus II secures two allies in the Black Sea region. Ptolemy III's armies reach as far as Bactria and the borders of India in their attacks on the Seleucid Empire.
- By defeating the Egyptian fleet at Andros, Antigonus II is able to maintain his control over the Aegean Sea.

==== Carthage ====
- Hamilcar Barca transfers his army to the slopes of Mount Eryx, from which he is able to lend support to the besieged garrison in the neighbouring town of Drepanum (Trapani).

==== China ====
- The Qin general Meng Ao annexes 13 cities from the State of Han.
- The Qin envoy Gan Luo persuades King Daoxiang of Zhao to cede five cities.
- The State of Zhao annexes dozens of cities from the State of Yan.

== Deaths ==
- Eudamidas II, king of Sparta
