= 141 BC =

141 BC in various calendars
- Gregorian calendar: 141 BC; CXLI BC
- Ab urbe condita: 613
- Ancient Egypt era: XXXIII dynasty, 183
- Pharaoh: Ptolemy VIII Physcon, 5
- Ancient Greek Olympiad (summer): 159th Olympiad, year 4
- Assyrian calendar: 4610
- Balinese saka calendar: N/A
- Bengali calendar: −734 – −733
- Berber calendar: 810
- Buddhist calendar: 404
- Burmese calendar: −778
- Byzantine calendar: 5368–5369
- Chinese calendar: 己亥年 (Earth Pig); 2557 or 2350 — to — 庚子年 (Metal Rat); 2558 or 2351
- Coptic calendar: −424 – −423
- Discordian calendar: 1026
- Ethiopian calendar: −148 – −147
- Hebrew calendar: 3620–3621
- Hindu calendars
- Vikram Samvat: −84 – −83
- Shaka Samvat: N/A
- Kali Yuga: 2960–2961
- Holocene calendar: 9860
- Iranian calendar: 762 BP – 761 BP
- Islamic calendar: 785 BH – 784 BH
- Javanese calendar: N/A
- Julian calendar: N/A
- Korean calendar: 2193
- Minguo calendar: 2052 before ROC 民前2052年
- Nanakshahi calendar: −1608
- Seleucid era: 171/172 AG
- Thai solar calendar: 402–403
- Tibetan calendar: ས་མོ་ཕག་ལོ་ (female Earth-Boar) −14 or −395 or −1167 — to — ལྕགས་ཕོ་བྱི་བ་ལོ་ (male Iron-Rat) −13 or −394 or −1166

Year 141 BC was a year of the pre-Julian Roman calendar. At the time it was known as the Year of the Consulship of Caepio and Pompeius (or, less frequently, year 613 Ab urbe condita). The denomination 141 BC for this year has been used since the early medieval period, when the Anno Domini calendar era became the prevalent method in Europe for naming years.

== Events ==
=== By place ===
==== Syria and Judea ====
- The Seleucid garrison negotiates the surrender of Jerusalem. Simon Maccabaeus assumes control of the city. He becomes prince (ruler) of Judea until 135 BC.
- Demetrius II of Syria made prisoner of Mithridates, king of the Parthians. Antiochus VII Sidetes becomes king of the Seleucid Empire in his absence.

==== Bactria ====
- Yuezhi refugees appear on the borders of the Greco-Bactrian kingdom.

==== China ====
- March 9 – Emperor Wu of Han ("Martial Emperor") starts to rule the Han dynasty.

== Births ==
- Salome Alexandra, queen and regent of Judea (d. 67 BC)

== Deaths ==
- Jing of Han, Chinese emperor of the Han dynasty (b. 188 BC)
- Publius Cornelius Scipio Nasica Corculum, Roman statesman
