= 156 BC =

156 BC in various calendars
- Gregorian calendar: 156 BC; CLVI BC
- Ab urbe condita: 598
- Ancient Egypt era: XXXIII dynasty, 168
- Pharaoh: Ptolemy VI Philometor, 25
- Ancient Greek Olympiad (summer): 156th Olympiad (victor)¹
- Assyrian calendar: 4595
- Balinese saka calendar: N/A
- Bengali calendar: −749 – −748
- Berber calendar: 795
- Buddhist calendar: 389
- Burmese calendar: −793
- Byzantine calendar: 5353–5354
- Chinese calendar: 甲申年 (Wood Monkey); 2542 or 2335 — to — 乙酉年 (Wood Rooster); 2543 or 2336
- Coptic calendar: −439 – −438
- Discordian calendar: 1011
- Ethiopian calendar: −163 – −162
- Hebrew calendar: 3605–3606
- Hindu calendars
- Vikram Samvat: −99 – −98
- Shaka Samvat: N/A
- Kali Yuga: 2945–2946
- Holocene calendar: 9845
- Iranian calendar: 777 BP – 776 BP
- Islamic calendar: 801 BH – 800 BH
- Javanese calendar: N/A
- Julian calendar: N/A
- Korean calendar: 2178
- Minguo calendar: 2067 before ROC 民前2067年
- Nanakshahi calendar: −1623
- Seleucid era: 156/157 AG
- Thai solar calendar: 387–388
- Tibetan calendar: ཤིང་ཕོ་སྤྲེ་ལོ་ (male Wood-Monkey) −29 or −410 or −1182 — to — ཤིང་མོ་བྱ་ལོ་ (female Wood-Bird) −28 or −409 or −1181

Year 156 BC was a year of the pre-Julian Roman calendar. At the time it was known as the Year of the Consulship of Lupus and Figulus (or, less frequently, year 598 Ab urbe condita) and the Eighth Year of Houyuan. The denomination 156 BC for this year has been used since the early medieval period, when the Anno Domini calendar era became the prevalent method in Europe for naming years.

== Events ==
=== By place ===
==== Roman Republic ====
- The first Dalmatian war begins.

== Births ==
- Emperor Wu of Han
