= 360s BC =

Decade

This article concerns the period 369 BC – 360 BC

== Events ==
=== 369 BC ===
==== By place ====
====== Greece ======
- After driving off the Spartan army that has threatened Mantinea, Epaminondas of Thebes moves south and crosses the Evrotas River (the frontier of Sparta), which no hostile army has breached in historical memory. The Spartans, unwilling to engage the massive Theban army in battle, remain inside their city while the Thebans and their allies ravage Laconia.
- Epaminondas briefly returns to Arcadia, then marches south to Messenia, a territory which the Spartans had conquered some 200 years before. There, Epaminondas starts the rebuilding of the ancient city of Messene on Mount Ithome, with fortifications that are among the strongest in Greece. He then issues a call to Messenian exiles all over Greece to return and rebuild their homeland. The loss of Messenia is particularly damaging to the Spartans, since the territory comprises one-third of Sparta's territory and contains half of their helot population.
- On returning to Thebes, Epaminondas is put on trial by his political enemies who charge that he has retained his command longer than constitutionally permitted. While this charge is considered to be true, Epaminondas persuades the Thebans that this has been necessary to protect Thebes and its allies and reduce the power of Sparta. As a result, the charges against him are dropped.
- In a search for a balance of power against the now powerful Thebes, Athens responds to an appeal for help from Sparta and allies itself with its traditional enemy.
- On the death of the Macedonian King Amyntas III, his eldest son Alexander II becomes king. The young king is simultaneously faced with an Illyrian invasion from the north-west and an attack from the east by the pretender of the Macedonian throne, Pausanias (who quickly captures several cities and threatens the queen mother, Eurydice). Alexander defeats his enemies with the help of the Athenian general Iphicrates, who has been sailing along the Macedonian coast on the way to recapture Amphipolis.
- Alexander of Pherae becomes tyrant of Thessaly following the death of his father. Alexander's tyranny causes the Aleuadae of Larissa to seek the help of Alexander II of Macedon. Alexander II successfully gains control of Larissa and several other cities but, betraying a promise he has made, put garrisons in them. This provokes a hostile reaction from Thebes. The Theban general Pelopidas drives the Macedonians from Thessaly.
- Pelopidas forces Alexander to abandon his alliance with Athens in favour of Thebes by threatening to support Alexander's brother-in-law, Ptolemy of Aloros. As part of this new alliance, Alexander is compelled to hand over hostages, including his younger brother Philip, the future conqueror of Greece.
- Cleomenes II succeeds his brother Agesipolis II as Agiad king of Sparta.

=== 368 BC ===
==== By place ====
====== Greece ======
- While the previous year's intervention by the Macedonians in Thessaly is successful, after the Macedonian troops withdraw, Alexander of Pherae treats his subjects as cruelly as before. So the Thessalians seek Thebes' support. Pelopidas is sent to their assistance, but is treacherously seized and imprisoned.
- In response, Epaminondas is reinstated in command of Theban troops and leads the Theban army into Thessaly, where he outmanoeuvres the Thessalians and secures the release of Pelopidas without a fight.
- At the instigation of Alexander's brother-in-law, Ptolemy of Aloros, Alexander II of Macedon is assassinated during a festival. Although Alexander's brother, Perdiccas III becomes the next king, he is under age, and Ptolemy is appointed regent.

====== China ======
- Zhou Xian Wang becomes king of the Zhou dynasty of China.

==== By topic ====
====== Philosophy ======
- Plato's Republic is completed. It lays down the rules for an ideal, righteous society and suggests that kings ought to be philosophers (or at least taught by philosophers).

=== 367 BC ===
==== By place ====
====== Greece ======
- The Theban general, Epaminondas, again invades the Peloponnesus, but this time achieves little beyond winning Sicyon over to an alliance with Thebes. When he returns to Thebes, he is again put on trial, and again acquitted.
- Archidamus III, son of Agesilaus II of Sparta, commands a Spartan army which scores a victory over the Arcadians.
- Theban leader Pelopidas goes on an embassy to the Persian king Artaxerxes II and induces him to propose a settlement of the Greek states' disputes according to the wishes of the Thebans. Artaxerxes II issues an edict consisting of peace terms for the Greeks, but his edict is not obeyed by any of the Greek states.
- Aristotle arrives in Athens and teaches at Plato's Academy.

====== Sicily ======
- Dionysius I of Syracuse dies and is succeeded as tyrant of the city by his son Dionysius II. As the younger Dionysius is weak and inexperienced, Dion, brother-in-law of the elder Dionysius, assumes control and persuades Plato, whose friendship he has acquired, to train the new tyrant in the practical application of his philosophical principles.
- Dionysius II makes peace with Carthage on the same terms established after his father's defeat by Carthage in the previous decade.

====== Roman Republic ======
- During the ten-year period that Gaius Licinius (Calvus) Stolo is tribune in Rome (376 BC to 367 BC) he does much to reduce the enmity between patricians and plebs by reforming a number of laws. During his term, he proposes the Lex Licinia Sextia, which restores the consulship to the plebs, requires a plebeian consul seat, limits the amount of public land that one person can hold, and regulates debts. The patricians oppose these laws, though they are now finally passed and take effect from 366 BC.
- The temple to Concordia on the Forum Romanum in Rome is built by Marcus Furius Camillus.

==== By topic ====
====== Philosophy ======
- The Greek philosopher and scientist, Aristotle, goes to Athens as a pupil at Plato's Academy.

=== 366 BC ===
==== By place ====
====== Persian Empire ======
- In Persia, a number of satraps of King Artaxerxes II begin a revolt, in alliance with Athens, Sparta, and Egypt, that lasts until 358 BC.

====== Greece ======
- Athens founds the town of Kos on the island of Kos in the Aegean Sea.
- Theban leader, Epaminondas, returns to the Peloponnesus for a third time, seeking to secure the allegiance of the states of Achaea. Although no army dares to challenge him in the field, the democratic governments he establishes there are short-lived, as pro-Spartan aristocrats soon return to the cities, reestablish the oligarchies, and bind their cities ever more closely to Sparta.
- Thebes makes peace with Sparta and then turns its attention on Athens, which is trying to revive its maritime empire and is interfering in Macedonian dynastic quarrels.
- Thebes captures the city of Oropus.

====== Sicily ======
- The experiment by Dion (brother-in-law of Dionysius I) and Plato to educate the new ruler of Syracuse, Dionysius II, in the practical application of Plato's philosophical principles fails and Dion and Plato are banished from Syracuse.

====== Roman Republic ======
- The use of military tribunes with consular power is abandoned permanently and the dual consulship is restored. A new magistracy is established, which is called the praetorship. Its holder, the praetor, is elected annually by the Assembly and takes charge of civil matters, thus relieving the consuls of this responsibility. The praetor is regarded as a junior colleague of the consuls. Nevertheless, the praetor can command an army, convene a Senate or an assembly, as well as exercise the consular functions.
- Two additional aediles, called curule ("higher") aediles, are created in the Roman hierarchy. These are at first patricians; but those of the next year are plebeians and so on year by year alternately. They are elected in the assembly of the tribes, with the consul presiding.

==== By topic ====
====== Arts ======
- The Abduction of Persephone, detail of a wall painting in Tomb I (Small Tomb) in Vergina, Macedonia, is made (approximate date).

=== 365 BC ===
==== By place ====
====== Greece ======
- Perdiccas III of Macedon, son of Amyntas III and Eurydice II, kills Ptolemy of Aloros, who has been the regent of Macedon since he arranged the assassination of Perdiccas III's brother Alexander II in 368 BC. With Ptolemy's death, Perdiccas III becomes King of Macedon in his own right.
- The Athenian forces under general Timotheus overrun Samos, then occupied by a Persian garrison, after a 10-month siege.

====== Roman Republic ======
- Etruscan actors stage the first theatrical performances in Rome.

=== 364 BC ===
==== By place ====
====== Greece ======
- On the advice of the city's military leader, Epaminondas, Thebes builds a fleet of 100 triremes to help combat Athens. Thebes destroys its Boeotian rival Orchomenus.
- Philip II of Macedon, brother of the reigning king of Macedonia, returns to his native land after having been held as a hostage in Thebes since 369 BC.
- The army of Thebes under their statesman and general, Pelopidas, defeats Alexander of Pherae in the Battle of Cynoscephalae in Thessaly, but Pelopidas is killed during the battle. As a result of his loss of this battle, Alexander is compelled by Thebes to acknowledge the freedom of the Thessalian cities, to limit his rule to Pherae, and to join the Boeotian League.
- The Spartans under Archidamus III are defeated by the Arcadians at Cromnus.
- The Athenian general, Iphicrates, fails in attempts to recover Amphipolis. Retiring to Thrace, Iphicrates fights for his father-in-law, the Thracian king Cotys I, against Athens for the possession of the Thracian Chersonese. Cotys I is victorious and controls the whole Chersonese peninsula by 359 BC.
- Timophanes, along with a number of colleagues, including his brother Timoleon, takes possession of the acropolis of Corinth and Timophanes makes himself master of the city. Later, Timoleon, after ineffectual protests, tacitly acquiesces to his colleagues putting Timophanes to death for his actions.

====== China ======
- The Chinese astronomer Gan De from the State of Qi reportedly discovers the moon Ganymede, belonging to Jupiter, and makes the earliest known sunspot observations.

=== 363 BC ===
==== By place ====
====== Egypt ======
- The Egyptian pharaoh Teos (or Tachos) succeeds his father Nectanebo I to the throne. Planning a great attack on Persia, he invites Sparta to help him.

====== Greece ======
- The Theban general, Epaminondas, makes a bold attempt to challenge Athens' naval empire. With a new Boeotian fleet, he sails to Byzantium, with the result that a number of cities in the Athenian Empire rebel against their now threatened masters.

=== 362 BC ===
==== By place ====
====== Persian Empire ======
- Mausolus of Caria joins the revolt of the satraps of Anatolia against the Persian king Artaxerxes II.

====== Egypt ======
- King Agesilaus II of Sparta arrives with 1,000 men to assist Egypt in its fight with Persia.

====== Greece ======
- The outbreak of civil war in the Arcadian league leads to Mantinea fighting alongside Sparta and Athens, while Tegea and other members of the league side with Thebes. The Theban general, Epaminondas leads the large allied army into the Peloponnesus, he is met by the Spartans (led by the Agiad Spartan king Agesilaus), Mantineans, Athenians, and their allies in the Battle of Mantinea. In the battle, Epaminondas is victorious, but is killed. His dying command to make peace with the enemy is followed by all sides and a general peace is established in Greece. The period of Theban domination of Greece comes to an end.

====== China ======
- The states of Qin, Han and Zhao defeat the state of Wei and Qin captures the prince of Wei. The Battle of Shaoliang is then fought between Qin and Wei, which Wei loses, whereupon Qin captures the prime minister of Wei.

=== 361 BC ===
==== By place ====
====== Persian Empire ======
- With the Persian empire weakening, revolts occur in many parts of the empire, including Sidon, a prosperous and rich Phoenician city.

====== Egypt ======
- The Egyptians under their King Teos and the Spartans under King Agesilaus II, with some Athenian mercenaries under their general Chabrias, set out to attack the Persian King's Phoenician cities. However, they have to return almost at once due to revolts back in Egypt. Subsequently, Agesilaus II quarrels with the Egyptian king and joins a revolt against him.

====== Greece ======
- Callistratus of Aphidnae, an Athenian orator and general, and the Athenian general, Chabrias, are brought to trial in Athens on account of the refusal of the Thebans to surrender the city of Oropus, which on Callistratus' advice the Thebans have been allowed to occupy temporarily. Despite his magnificent oration in his defence (which so impresses Demosthenes that he resolves to study oratory), Callistratus is condemned to death. He flees to Methone in Macedonia, where he is accommodated by King Perdiccas III who draws on his financial expertise. Chabrias is acquitted and then accepts a command under the King of Egypt, Teos, who is defending his country against Persian attempts at reconquest.

====== Sicily ======
- Plato returns once more to Syracuse to teach the young Syracusan tyrant Dionysius II. He fails to reconcile the tyrant to Dion, who Dionysius II banished in 366 BC. Because of this, Plato is forced to flee Syracuse to save his life.

=== 360 BC ===
==== By place ====
====== Egypt ======
- With the help of King Agesilaus II of Sparta, Nectanebo II deposes Teos and becomes king of Egypt. Teos flees to Susa and makes peace with the Persians. Nectanebo II pays the Spartans 230 talents for their help.

====== Judea ======
- Jerusalem has been rebuilt and the power of Judaism's hereditary priesthood is firmly established.

====== Greece ======
- The King of Sparta, Agesilaus II, dies at Cyrene, Cyrenaica, on his way home to Greece from Egypt. He is succeeded by his son Archidamus III as Eurypontid king of Sparta.
- As the Illyrians attack the Molossians, the Molossian king Arymbas brings his non-combatant people to safety elsewhere. When the Illyrians have finished looting, they are burdened with booty and are thus easily defeated by the Molossians.

====== Roman Republic ======
- The Gauls again reach the gates of Rome, but are beaten back.

==== By topic ====
====== Literature ======
- Plato writes the dialogues Timaeus and Critias, first mentioning Atlantis.

== Births ==
369 BC

- Zhuang Zhou, Chinese Taoist philosopher

367 BC

- Ptolemy, Macedonian general, later founder of the Ptolemaic dynasty of Egypt (d. 282 BC)

363 BC

- Barsine, mistress of Alexander the Great

362 BC

- Eumenes of Cardia, Greek general and scholar (d. 316 BC)

361 BC

- Agathocles, tyrant of Syracuse (d. 289 BC)

360 BC

- Callisthenes of Olynthus, Greek historian (d. 327 BC)
- Lysimachus, Macedonian diadochus (d. 281 BC)
- Pyrrho of Elis, Greek skeptic philosopher (d. c. 270 BC)

== Deaths ==
369 BC

- Amyntas III, king of Macedonia
- Theaetetus, Athenian mathematician (b. c. 417 BC)
- Zhou Lie Wang, king of the Zhou dynasty

368 BC

- Alexander II, King of Macedonia (assassinated)

367 BC

- Dionysius I, tyrant of Syracuse (b. 430 BC)

365 BC

- Marcus Furius Camillus, Roman soldier and statesman. (b. c. 446 BC)
- Eurydice II, Macedonian queen and mother of Philip II of Macedon
- Antisthenes, Athenian philosopher (b. c. 445 BC)

364 BC

- Pelopidas, Theban statesman (killed in the Battle of Cynoscephalae in Thessaly)

363 BC

- Nectanebo I, pharaoh of Egypt
- Marquess Gong of Han, ruler of the State of Han

362 BC

- Epaminondas of Thebes, Greek general and statesman (b. c. 418 BC)
- Duke Xian of Qin, ruler of the Zhou dynasty state of Qin
- Datames, satrap of Cappadocia and military leader

361 BC

- Leosthenes, Athenian admiral

360 BC

- Agesilaus II, Eurypontid king of Sparta (b. c.444 BC)
