= 361 BC =

361 BC in various calendars
Gregorian calendar	361 BC; CCCLXI BC
Ab urbe condita	393
Ancient Egypt era	XXX dynasty, 20
Pharaoh	Djedhor, 2
Ancient Greek Olympiad (summer)	104th Olympiad, year 4
Assyrian calendar	4390
Balinese saka calendar	N/A
Bengali calendar	−954 – −953
Berber calendar	590
Buddhist calendar	184
Burmese calendar	−998
Byzantine calendar	5148–5149
Chinese calendar	己未年 (Earth Goat); 2337 or 2130 — to — 庚申年 (Metal Monkey); 2338 or 2131
Coptic calendar	−644 – −643
Discordian calendar	806
Ethiopian calendar	−368 – −367
Hebrew calendar	3400–3401
- Hindu calendars
Vikram Samvat	−304 – −303
Shaka Samvat	N/A
Kali Yuga	2740–2741
Holocene calendar	9640
Iranian calendar	982 BP – 981 BP
Islamic calendar	1012 BH – 1011 BH
Javanese calendar	N/A
Julian calendar	N/A
Korean calendar	1973
Minguo calendar	2272 before ROC 民前2272年
Nanakshahi calendar	−1828
Thai solar calendar	182–183
Tibetan calendar	阴土羊年 (female Earth-Goat) −234 or −615 or −1387 — to — 阳金猴年 (male Iron-Monkey) −233 or −614 or −1386

Year 361 BC was a year of the pre-Julian Roman calendar. At the time, it was known as the Year of the Consulship of Stolo and Peticus (or, less frequently, year 393 Ab urbe condita). The denomination 361 BC for this year has been used since the early medieval period, when the Anno Domini calendar era became the prevalent method in Europe for naming years.

== Events ==
=== By place ===
==== Persian Empire ====
- With the Persian empire weakening, revolts occur in many parts of the empire, including Sidon, a prosperous and rich Phoenician city.

==== Egypt ====
- The Egyptians under their King Teos and the Spartans under King Agesilaus II, with some Athenian mercenaries under their general Chabrias, set out to attack the Persian King's Phoenician cities. However, they have to return almost at once due to revolts back in Egypt. Subsequently, Agesilaus II quarrels with the Egyptian king and joins a revolt against him.

==== Greece ====
- Callistratus of Aphidnae, an Athenian orator and general, and the Athenian general, Chabrias, are brought to trial in Athens on account of the refusal of the Thebans to surrender the city of Oropus, which on Callistratus' advice the Thebans have been allowed to occupy temporarily. Despite his magnificent oration in his defence (which so impresses Demosthenes that he resolves to study oratory), Callistratus is condemned to death. He flees to Methone in Macedonia, where he is accommodated by King Perdiccas III who draws on his financial expertise. Chabrias is acquitted and then accepts a command under the King of Egypt, Teos, who is defending his country against Persian attempts at reconquest.

==== Sicily ====
- Plato returns once more to Syracuse to teach the young Syracusan tyrant Dionysius II. He fails to reconcile the tyrant to Dion, who Dionysius II banished in 366 BC. Because of this, Plato is forced to flee Syracuse to save his life.

== Births ==
- Agathocles, tyrant of Syracuse (d. 289 BC)

== Deaths ==
- Leosthenes, Athenian admiral
