= 436 (disambiguation) =

436 may refer to:

- 436 BC
- 436 AD
- 436 Patricia, a large asteroid
- Gliese 436, a red dwarf star with at least one known planet
- London Buses route 436
- Population 436, a 2006 film
- 436th Airlift Wing of the Dover Air Force Base

== See also ==
- 436th (disambiguation)
