= Against Leptines =

Speech given by Demosthenes

"Against Leptines" was a speech given by Demosthenes in which he called for the repeal of a law sponsored by Leptines, which denied anyone a special exemption from paying public charges (leitourgiai). Leptines had proposed the law around the years 355–54 BC. Although the name of the speech highlights Leptines, the content focuses on the unconstitutional nature of the law, rather than the fact that Leptines was the one who proposed it. During the time of the speech, it was understood that enough time had passed in which Leptines was no longer in the legal limit to be held accountable for the passing of the law. For that reason, Leptines was not personally attacked in the speech. Rather, the speech exhibits peaceful, stylistic choices that were unique for the time because of the lack of personal attacks against Leptines. Though Demosthenes wrote the speech for Ctesippus, the son of Chabrias, he delivered it himself. It is thus the first speech which Demosthenes delivered in a public case.

== History ==
This law had been proposed by a man named Leptines, so the speech came to be known as "Against Leptines". The law was proposed as a way to tax Athenians like Ctesippus whose father was a General, making him exempt from liturgies. Due to the Social War Athens was experiencing an economic downturn, making liturgies essential. Although Dio Chrysostom (31.128–9) says that Demosthenes won the case, his account has been dismissed as inaccurate. West says that "we do not know the verdict".

An inscription shows that Ctesippus, son of Chabrias (whose inheritable exemption Demosthenes was arguing to preserve), performed a liturgy that "is unlikely to have been voluntary," and there is no evidence of any grants of exemption after the trial.

== Background ==
During the Social War, a number of measures were passed in Athens to increase public revenue, including a law proposed by Leptines in 356 which abolished exemptions from liturgies. The law made it illegal both for the people of Athens to grant exceptions to liturgies, and for anybody to request an exception. The law was challenged by an Athenian called Bathippus, but he died before the case came to court; later, this case was taken up by his son, Aphepsion. Aphepsion proposed that Leptines' law should be repealed, and that it should be replaced by a law that provided for a procedure to remove an illegally-obtained exemption from liturgies. The case came to court in 355–54 BC.
