= Aphepsion =

Aphepsion (Ancient Greek: Ἀφεψίων), was a son of Bathippus, who commenced operations against the law of the orator Leptines. This law proposed that no Athenian, whether citizen or resident alien, should be exempt from the public charges (leitourgiai) for the state festivals.

Bathippus died soon after, and his son Aphepsion resumed the matter. He was joined by Ctesippus.

Phormion, the orator, spoke for Aphepsion, and Demosthenes for Ctesippus.
