= 365 BC =

365 BC in various calendars
Gregorian calendar	365 BC; CCCLXV BC
Ab urbe condita	389
Ancient Egypt era	XXX dynasty, 16
Pharaoh	Nectanebo I, 16
Ancient Greek Olympiad (summer)	103rd Olympiad, year 4
Assyrian calendar	4386
Balinese saka calendar	N/A
Bengali calendar	−958 – −957
Berber calendar	586
Buddhist calendar	180
Burmese calendar	−1002
Byzantine calendar	5144–5145
Chinese calendar	乙卯年 (Wood Rabbit); 2333 or 2126 — to — 丙辰年 (Fire Dragon); 2334 or 2127
Coptic calendar	−648 – −647
Discordian calendar	802
Ethiopian calendar	−372 – −371
Hebrew calendar	3396–3397
- Hindu calendars
Vikram Samvat	−308 – −307
Shaka Samvat	N/A
Kali Yuga	2736–2737
Holocene calendar	9636
Iranian calendar	986 BP – 985 BP
Islamic calendar	1016 BH – 1015 BH
Javanese calendar	N/A
Julian calendar	N/A
Korean calendar	1969
Minguo calendar	2276 before ROC 民前2276年
Nanakshahi calendar	−1832
Thai solar calendar	178–179
Tibetan calendar	阴木兔年 (female Wood-Rabbit) −238 or −619 or −1391 — to — 阳火龙年 (male Fire-Dragon) −237 or −618 or −1390

Year 365 BC was a year of the pre-Julian Roman calendar. At the time, it was known as the Year of the Consulship of Aventinensis and Ahala (or, less frequently, year 389 Ab urbe condita). The denomination 365 BC for this year has been used since the early medieval period, when the Anno Domini calendar era became the prevalent method in Europe for naming years.

== Events ==
=== By place ===
==== Greece ====
- Perdiccas III of Macedon, son of Amyntas III and Eurydice II, kills Ptolemy of Aloros, who has been the regent of Macedon since he arranged the assassination of Perdiccas III's brother Alexander II in 368 BC. With Ptolemy's death, Perdiccas III becomes King of Macedon in his own right.
- The Athenian forces under general Timotheus overrun Samos, then occupied by a Persian garrison, after a 10-month siege.

==== Roman Republic ====
- Etruscan actors stage the first theatrical performances in Rome.

== Deaths ==
- Marcus Furius Camillus, Roman soldier and statesman. (b. c. 446 BC)
- Eurydice II, Macedonian queen and mother of Philip II of Macedon
- Antisthenes, Athenian philosopher (b. c. 445 BC)
