= 361st Division =

361st Division may refer to:

- 361st Infantry Division, Wehrmacht, Germany
- 361st Rifle Division, Soviet Union

== See also ==
- List of military divisions by number
- 361st (disambiguation)
