= Callistratus of Aphidnae =

4th century BCE Athenian orator and general

Kallistratos of Aphidnae (Ancient Greek: Καλλίστρατος, Latinized: Callistratus; bef. 415–aft. 355 BCE) was an Athenian orator and general in the 4th century BCE.

== Family ==
Little is known of his background, though he appears to have been of the liturgical class with interests in commerce rather than agriculture. His father was Kallikratous and he was a nephew by marriage of the Athenian demagogue Agyrrhios, though whose sister married whose brother is unknown. Aphidna was one of the towns of Attica.

== Career ==
The earliest mention of Kallistratos was in 379 when the Theban Pelopidas used his name to gain entry to the home of his rival Leontidas in order to assassinate him. This was the opening gambit in the anti-Spartan party's campaign to retake control of the Theban government and expel the Spartan garrison occupying the Kadmeia. Their success led directly to the Boeotian War (379–75). It is unclear whether Kallistratos was actually involved in the plot or what his name was supposed to mean to Leontidas.

He was already a force in Athenian politics, though, and the next year, after the aborted invasion of Attica by the Spartan Sphodrias, he was elected strategos along with Timotheos and Chabrias.

In 375, during the negotiations that led to the peace treaty ending the war, he is recorded as trying to convince the Theban delegation to give up their dream of uniting the cities of Boeotia in a federation. In this he was unsuccessful and Thebes was the only city involved in the war not to sign the treaty. This, of course, meant that the war was to continue, since Thebes would not give up on the Boeotian Federation and Sparta would not accept its existence.

In 373, Timotheos was commissioned by Athens to take a fleet to the island of Kerkyra to protect it from a Spartan takeover. His ships were undermanned, however, and he was not provided with the funds to pay his sailors and troops. So he spent most of the summer sailing season in the Aegean trying to make up for the shortages. He was unsuccessful in this, though he gained new allies for Athens in the process. He returned to Athens without fulfilling his mission. For this Kallistratos and Iphikrates prosecuted him, but the specific charges are unclear. Demosthenes reports that two heads of state, Alketas of Makedon and Jason of Pherai (Thessaly) came to Athens to support him at the trial and this helped secure his acquittal. His treasurer and confidential agent Antimachos, however, was found guilty, condemned to death, and had his property confiscated by the state.

The next year Iphikrates was chosen to complete the same mission and he chose Kallistratos and Chabrias to accompany him as co-commanders.

In 371, after more years of fighting, Athens sought once again to negotiate peace with Sparta and invited Thebes to attend a conference in Sparta. At this event, three Athenians spoke in an effort to convince the Spartans to accept the peace: Kallias tried to paper over the differences between the two cities; Autokles berated the Spartans for past sins; and Kallistratos, striking a more conciliatory tone, admitted that both sides had made mistakes and they had different interests, but these were no reason to destroy each other in constant war. Making peace sooner rather than later made the most sense.

Kallistratos’ arguments convinced the Spartans and peace was agreed – on the condition that each combatant withdraw its garrisons from all the cities where they were stationed so that all cities could be autonomous. Armies and navies would be dissolved. If any city violated the treaty, anyone could go to war with them, but others were not required to join in. Thebes, once again, chose not to sign if they could not sign for the Boeotian Federation. Sparta, for its part, chose to punish them for this. What followed a few weeks later was the Battle of Leuktra, which marked the beginning of the end of Spartan military dominance in Greece.

=== Oropos Affair ===
The coastal village of Oropos lay in the northwest corner of Attica, next to Boeotia. Control of the area had shifted back and forth between Athens and Thebes for generations, and in the year of 366 was an Athenian territory. Certain exiles from the village had induced Themison, tyrant of Eretria in Euboea, to take control so they could return. Athens sent out a regiment commanded by Chares to take it back, but by the time it got there, Thebes had stepped in and taken it for themselves.

In the later Assembly debate over to what to do, Kallistratos and Chabrias advised restraint, expecting that the situation could be resolved diplomatically. When Thebes refused to cede control, the two men were brought up on charges. The specifics are not clear, but in ancient Athens anyone could sue anyone for almost anything. The eloquence of Kallistratos at the trial convinced the jury to acquit them, and in the process inspired a young Demosthenes to embark on a career in oratory.

=== Exile ===
In 362/1 Kallistratos was indicted again, but whether it was a renewal of the earlier charge or a new offense is not clear. In this case, he chose exile over trial and was condemned to death in absentia. He made his way to Methone, a seaport in Makedonia, ruled at that time by Perdikkas III. While there he arranged to have the harbor dues doubled from twenty talents to forty.

Demosthenes reported that while there he sought passage on an Athenian warship from Methone to the island of Thasos to see his son-in-law Timomachos, who was in charge of the Athenian garrison there. The trierarch Apollodoros refused, since it was against the law for him to harbor or aid an exile.

Kallistratos eventually did make it to Thasos and from there, in c. 360, was instrumental in helping the Thasians found a colony at Datos, across the strait in Thrace in the territory of Edonia. The city was renamed Krenides and was later taken over by Philip II, who renamed it Philippi.

=== Return to Athens ===
From the orator Lykourgos we learn Kallistratos' ultimate fate:

Who does not know the fate of Kallistratos, which the older among you remember and the younger have heard recounted, the man condemned to death by the city? How he fled and later, hearing from the god at Delphi that if he returned to Athens he would have fair treatment by the laws, came back and taking refuge at the altar of the Twelve Gods was none the less put to death by the state, and rightly so, for "fair treatment by the laws" is, in the case of wrongdoers, punishment. And thus the god, too, acted rightly in allowing those who had been wronged to punish the offender. For it would be an unseemly thing if revelations made to good men were the same as those vouchsafed to malefactors.

The date of his return to Athens is a matter of conjecture. Isokrates in On the Peace, written in early 355, makes no mention of his return, thus making that year the earliest it could have been. Lykourgos’ Against Leokrates was written in 330. His comment about younger men having only heard the tale recounted suggests that Kallistratos’ return was not long after 355. The Social War, where Athens was fighting several of its allies, concluded that year and it is possible that Kallistratos saw an opportunity to repatriate at this time of renewed peace. Unfortunately, the anger at his crime of 361 had not abated and even the sanctuary of the Twelve Gods was not strong enough to protect him.
