= 368th Regiment =

368th Regiment may refer to:

- 368th Infantry Regiment, United States
- 368th (4th West Lancashire) Medium Regiment, Royal Artillery

== See also ==
- 368th (disambiguation)
