= 361st =

361st may refer to:

- 361st Bombardment Squadron or 1st Antisubmarine Squadron, inactive United States Air Force unit
- 361st Fighter Group, World War II United States Army Air Forces combat organization
- 361st Fighter Squadron or 461st Flight Test Squadron, United States Air Force squadron, stationed at Edwards Air Force Base, California
- 361st Intelligence, Surveillance and Reconnaissance Group, intelligence unit located at Hurlburt Field, Florida
- 361st Tactical Electronic Warfare Squadron, inactive United States Air Force unit

== See also ==
- 361 (number)
- 361, the year 361 (CCCLXI) of the Julian calendar
- 361 BC
