= 289 BC =

289 BC in various calendars
Gregorian calendar	289 BC; CCLXXXIX BC
Ab urbe condita	465
Ancient Egypt era	XXXIII dynasty, 35
Pharaoh	Ptolemy I Soter, 35
Ancient Greek Olympiad (summer)	122nd Olympiad, year 4
Assyrian calendar	4462
Balinese saka calendar	N/A
Bengali calendar	−882 – −881
Berber calendar	662
Buddhist calendar	256
Burmese calendar	−926
Byzantine calendar	5220–5221
Chinese calendar	辛未年 (Metal Goat); 2409 or 2202 — to — 壬申年 (Water Monkey); 2410 or 2203
Coptic calendar	−572 – −571
Discordian calendar	878
Ethiopian calendar	−296 – −295
Hebrew calendar	3472–3473
- Hindu calendars
Vikram Samvat	−232 – −231
Shaka Samvat	N/A
Kali Yuga	2812–2813
Holocene calendar	9712
Iranian calendar	910 BP – 909 BP
Islamic calendar	938 BH – 937 BH
Javanese calendar	N/A
Julian calendar	N/A
Korean calendar	2045
Minguo calendar	2200 before ROC 民前2200年
Nanakshahi calendar	−1756
Seleucid era	23/24 AG
Thai solar calendar	254–255
Tibetan calendar	阴金羊年 (female Iron-Goat) −162 or −543 or −1315 — to — 阳水猴年 (male Water-Monkey) −161 or −542 or −1314

Year 289 BC was a year of the pre-Julian Roman calendar. At the time it was known as the Year of the Consulship of Corvus and Noctua (or, less frequently, year 465 Ab urbe condita). The denomination 289 BC for this year has been used since the early medieval period, when the Anno Domini calendar era became the prevalent method in Europe for naming years.

== Events ==
=== By place ===
==== Sicily ====
- The tyrant of Syracuse, Agathocles, dies after restoring the Syracusan democracy on his death bed by stating that he does not want his sons to succeed him as king. However, the resulting dissension among his family about the succession leads to a renewal of Carthaginian power in Sicily.

==== China ====
- General Sima Cuo of the State of Qin attacks the State of Wei, recaptures the city of Yuan and captures the cities of Heyong and Jueqiao.

== Deaths ==
- Agathocles, tyrant of Syracuse, Sicily from 317 BC and self-styled king of Sicily after 304 BC (b. 361 BC)
- Mencius (Mèng Zǐ or Meng Zhu), Chinese philosopher (approximate date) (b. c. 372 BC)
