= 436th =

436th may refer to:

- 436th Airlift Wing, an active United States Air Force unit assigned to the Air Mobility Command Eighteenth Air Force based at Dover Air Force Base, Delaware
- 436th Operations Group, an active United States Air Force unit, the flying component of the Eighteenth Air Force 436th Airlift Wing
- 436th Tactical Fighter Training Squadron, an inactive United States Air Force unit
- 436th Training Squadron, an active United States Air Force unit assigned to the Air Combat Command 7th Bomb Wing, based at Dyess AFB, Texas

== See also ==
- 436 (number)
- 436, the year 436 (CDXXXVI) of the Julian calendar
- 436 BC
