= Ateleia (ancient Greece) =

Exemption from civic duty in Ancient Greece

Ateleia (Attic Greek: ἀτέλεια; privative a + τέλος telos (tax); see also philately) in ancient Greece was a general immunity (ἄδεια adeia) or exemption from some or all the duties which a person has to perform towards the state.

Immunities could be granted either as a privilege to the citizens of a state, exempting them from certain duties which would otherwise be incumbent on them, or they are given as honorary distinctions to foreign kings, states, communities or even private individuals. With regard to the latter the ateleia was usually an exemption from custom duties on the importation or exportation of goods, and was given as a reward for certain good services.

== Historical examples ==
- Croesus received the ateleia at Delphi (Herod, i. 54)
- the Attic Deceleans at Sparta (Herod, ix. 73)
- Leucon, the ruler of Bosporan Kingdom, at Athens. (Dem. c. Lept. p. 466, &c.)

It appears that if a person thus distinguished, or a citizen of a foreign community possessing the ateleia, took up his residence in the state which had granted it, he also enjoyed other privileges, such as the exemption from the protection money, or tax which resident aliens had to pay at Athens. (Harpocrat. s. v. isoteles)

This ateleia might even become equivalent to the full franchise, as, e. g. the Byzantines gave the exemption from liturgies, and the franchise to all Athenians that might go to Byzantium. (Dem. De Coron. p. 256.) In many instances a partial ateleia, or an exemption from custom duties, was granted for the purpose of encouraging commerce. (Theophr. Char. 23; Schol. ad Aristoph. Plut. 905, with Bockh's remarks, Publ. Earn. p. 87.) With regard to the inhabitants of a state, we must, as in the case of Athens, again distinguish between two classes, the resident aliens (metics) and real citizens. At Athens all resident aliens had to pay a tax (metoikion or xenikon telos) which we may term protection-tax, because it was the price for the protection they enjoyed at Athens; but as it was the interest of the state to increase commerce, and for that purpose to attract strangers to settle at Athens, many of them were exempted from this tax, i. e. enjoyed the ateleia metoikiou, (isoteleia equal rights) (Dem. c. Aristae): p. 691), and some were even exempted from custom duties, and the property tax or eisphora from which an Athenian citizen could never be exempted. The ateleia enjoyed by Athenian citizens was either a general immunity (ateleia apanton), such as was granted to persons who had done some great service to their country, and even to their descendants, as in the case of Harmodius and Aristogeiton; or it was a partial one exempting a person from all or certain liturgies, from certain custom duties, or from service in the army. The last of these immunities was legally enjoyed by all members of the council of the Five Hundred (Lycurg. c. Leocr. 11), and the archons for the time being, by the farmers of the custom duties (Dem. c. Neaer. 1353), and by those who traded by sea, although with them the exemption must have been limited. (Schol. ad Arist. Plut. 905, Acham. 39i); Suid. s. v. emporos eimi) Most information respecting the ateleia is derived from Demosthenes' speech against Leptines. But compare also Wolf's Prolegom. ad Lept. p. Ixxi. &c.; Bockh, Pz^ Econ. p. 85, &c.; Westermann, De publicis Atheniensium Honoribus et Praemiis^ p. 6, &c. [L. S.]
