= Misthophoria =

Misthophoria (μισθοφορία, which literally means paid function), was the institutionalized remuneration of ancient Athenian citizens, who temporarily left their jobs to participate in public services.

It was first established in the 5th century BC by Pericles (c. 495–429 BC) for citizens who held the positions of jurors. Such award was meant by him to counterbalance the ties of patronage created by the magnificence with which Pericles' rival, Cimon, performed his liturgical responsibilities. This payment, to some extent anonymous, allowed the average Athenian citizen to perform public functions without becoming dependent on, or obligated to, the wealthiest.
