= Chabrias =

4th-century BCE Athenian general

- Born: Aixone, Athens (now Glyfada)
- Died: 357 BC Chios
- Allegiance: Athens
- Rank: Strategos
- Conflicts: Corinthian War; Boeotian War; Social War

Chabrias (Greek: Χαβρίας; bef. 420–357 BC) was an Athenian general active in the first half of the 4th century BC. During his career he was involved in several battles, both on land and sea. The orator Demosthenes described him as one of the most successful commanders Athens ever had:

To sum up the whole: he is the only general who never lost a single city or post or ship or soldier, when he commanded you: none of your enemies has any trophy over you and him, while you have many over many enemies under his command.

== Family ==
Little is known of Chabrias' background, except that his father's name was Ctesippus and that he was rich enough to be subject to the liturgy, having been a trierarch in 377–376 BC. He is known to have had one other son, also named Ctesippus.

== Career ==
=== Corinthian War (395–387 BC) ===
Chabrias’s first appearance in the historical record was his appointment as strategos (general) in 390–89 during the Corinthian War (so called because most of the fighting took place in and around Corinth). In this conflict, Athens joined a coalition including Thebes, Corinth, and Argos to challenge Sparta's dominance and unfair treatment of various cities in Greece. His first assignment in the spring of 389 was to replace his fellow general Iphicrates as commander of the Athenian garrison at Corinth when Iphicrates was recalled to Athens.

Within the year the garrison itself was recalled and in 388 BC Chabrias was given command of a small fleet (ten ships and 800 peltasts) to assist King Evagoras of the city of Salamis on the island of Cyprus, who was attempting to secede from the Persian empire. At the time, the Spartans had stationed a garrison on the island of Aegina which was harassing Athenian shipping through the Saronic Gulf and raiding small villages on the Attic coast. On his outbound leg, Chabrias staged a night time landing on Aegina to set up an ambush. The next morning a second Athenian force under Demainetos landed and openly marched inland. The Spartan garrison came out to attack them and was caught in the trap. The garrison commander Gorgopas was killed, along with hundreds of Spartan and Aegetinian troops. The Attic coast was then free from raids and Athens had command of the sea once again – at least for the time being.

The Corinthian War ended with a peace agreement imposed on Greece by the Great King of Persia, Artaxerxes II (also known as the Peace of Antalkides, for the Spartan diplomat who negotiated it). This cessation in fighting left those Greeks inclined to mercenary service free to participate in wars outside their homeland. Chabrias took advantage of this situation and sometime in the 386-384 BC period, without official sanction from the Athenian government, hired himself out to the Egyptian king Hakor to lead the Greek mercenary force the king had assembled for his attempt to break away from Persian control. Then, as Diodorus Siculus tells it:

Pharnabazus, who had been appointed by the King general of the Persian armies, prepared large supplies of war material, and also sent ambassadors to Athens, first to denounce Chabrias, who by becoming general of the Egyptians was alienating, so he said, the King's affection from the people of Athens, and, secondly, to urge them to give him Iphikrates as general. The Athenians, being eager to gain the favor of the Persian King and to incline Pharnabazus to themselves, quickly recalled Chabrias from Egypt and dispatched Iphikrates as general to act in alliance with the Persians.

Though Chabrias' participation on the Egyptian side of the conflict was embarrassing to Athens, it did not seriously harm his long-term career. He was shortly called back into service.

=== Boeotian War (378–371 BC) ===
In the winter of 379–8 BC, Thebes and Sparta went to war over Thebes efforts to unite Boeotia into a federated state. Sparta had previously occupied Thebes’ Cadmeia, killed Ismenias, the leader of the anti-Spartan faction in the city and were supporting by force a pro-Spartan regime. This winter, exiled Thebans living in Athens returned to their city and killed the pro-Spartan oligarchs, and forced the Spartan garrison to quit the city. Sparta responded by sending an army under the command of one of its kings, Cleombrotus, to reestablish the status quo. To prevent this army from passing through Attica on its way north, Chabrias was dispatched to the border region to guard the road that led through Eleutherai. This forced Cleombrotus to enter Boeotia by another route.

Athens soon joined the war on the Theban side and in the spring of 378 BC, King Agesilaos II of Sparta led an army of eighteen thousand Peloponnesians into Boeotia to attack Thebes. Chabrias was dispatched with a mercenary force of five thousand to assist the Thebans in holding off the attack. Taking a position at the top of a ridge near the city, the combined Theban/Athenian army waited as the Peloponnesians approached. The first wave of the attack was by the Spartan peltasts and was easily repulsed. Agesilaos ordered his hoplites to attack next and as they began to climb the ridge, Chabrias gave a signal and the whole Athenian force, joined by the Theban Sacred Band, instantly stood at ease – shields leaning on each soldier's left knee and spears resting on the ground, pointing upward. It was a gesture of contempt, but it also spoke to the high level of discipline of the troops and gave Agesilaos pause. Rather than attack such a force while climbing uphill, he recalled his forces and left the field. Though the Peloponnesians were free to ravage the surrounding country, Thebes itself was safe. It was a moral and psychological victory for Thebes, and...

This device was so extolled by fame throughout Greece, that Chabrias chose to have the statue, which was erected to him at the public charge by the Athenians in the agora, made in that posture. Hence it happened that wrestlers, and other candidates for public applause, adopted, in the erection of their statues, those postures in which they had gained a victory.

In 378 BC, Athens began building what is called the Second Athenian Confederacy. Cities from all over Greece signed on, including almost all those on the island of Euboea. Histiaia, at the north end of the island, was the one holdout, due to Athens having driven out the citizens in 446 and established a Cleruchy there. After the Peloponnesian War, Sparta had restored the city to its original citizens and they were not now inclined to join with the rest of the island in joining Athens’ new league. Athens, wishing to complete its alliance with all the cities of Euboea, sent Chabrias to deal with the situation. As Diodorus tells it,

Chabrias, in command of the force dispatched by the Athenians, laid waste Histiaia, and, fortifying its Metropolis, as it is called, which is situated on a naturally steep hill, left a garrison in it, and then sailed to the Cyclades and won over Peparethos and Sciathos and some other islands which had been subject to the Lacedaemonians.

Two years later (376 BC), after another expedition into Boeotia, the Sparta's Peloponnesian allies prevailed upon it to institute a naval blockade of Athens rather than put them through another long march to the north. This Sparta attempted to do, and initially was successful in stopping grain shipments into the port of Piraeus. Athens soon sent Chabrias out to break up the Spartan fleet. The battle, which took place off the island of Naxos, went to the Athenians and shipments resumed. It is worth noting that when Chabrias had the remnants of the Spartan fleet on the run, he held back his ships so they could retrieve those in the water, both living and dead. As Diodorus relates:

For he recalled the Battle of Arginusae (406 BC) and that the ekklesia, in return for the great service performed by victorious generals, condemned them to death on the charge that they had failed to bury the men who had perished in the fight; consequently he was afraid, since the circumstances were much the same, that he might run the risk of a similar fate. Accordingly, refraining from pursuit, he gathered up the bodies of his fellow citizens which were afloat, saved those who still lived, and buried the dead. Had he not engaged in this task he would easily have destroyed the whole enemy fleet. In the battle eighteen triremes on the Athenian side were destroyed; on the Lakedaimonian side twenty-four were destroyed and eight captured with their crews. Chabrias then, having won a notable victory, sailed back laden with spoils to the Peiraieus and met with an enthusiastic reception from his fellow citizens. Since the Peloponnesian War this was the first naval battle the Athenians had won.

In appreciation for this victory, and for his service to the city to date, the Athenians granted Chabrias and his descendants ateleia, or freedom from the liturgies (providing warships, as his father had done, or choruses for dramatic productions, or managing and funding a gymnasium, etc.). To Chabrias’ credit, he did not insist of this exemption, later serving as trierarch in c. 365 and choregos sometime after 360. Diodorus reports a further action by Chabrias the following year (375 BC) in Thrace. The Triballi, an inland tribe suffering from a famine, invaded the region around Abdera, a coastal city, ravaging the land with impunity. On their way home, the Abderites attacked them, killing some two thousand. The Triballi later retaliated and, drawing the Abderites into a trap, the latter were–

butchered almost to a man, as many as took part in the fight. But just after the Abderites had suffered so great a disaster and were on the point of being besieged, Chabrias the Athenian suddenly appeared with troops and snatched them out of their perils. He drove the barbarians from the country, and, after leaving a considerable garrison in the city, was himself assassinated by certain persons.

This last event is clearly an error, for Chabrias lived another eighteen years.

In the spring of 373 BC, Chabrias "won the race at the Pythian games with his chariot and four, which he purchased from the sons of Mitys the Argive, and, on his return from Delphi, gave a banquet to celebrate the victory at Kolias (a promontory on the Attic coast south of Athens). From the historian Hypereides we learn that Chabrias owned a mansion. Using the location of this banquet, it is reasonable to suggest that it was located not in Athens, but along the coast south of the city.

In 371 BC, Thebes defeated the Spartan army at Leuktra and the whole military balance of power in Greece changed. Thebes was now the dominant power and repeatedly invaded the Peloponnese to consolidate its new-found power. In the course of these invasions it liberated the helots, those peoples of Messene who had been Spartan slaves for centuries. Seeing Thebes thus become the aggressor, Athens concluded a mutual defense treaty with Sparta, which still had allies in the Peloponnese. In 369 BC Thebes planned an expedition into the Peloponnese and Chabrias was dispatched with an army to Korinth to help the Spartans and their allies repel it. The combined armies created a defensive line across the isthmus outside the city but the Thebans punched through and proceeded to ravage the countryside from Troezen and Epidauros in the south to Sikyon in the north. They eventually returned to Korinth and managed to force their way through the gates into the city. Chabrias and his Athenians drove them out again.

In the rivalry which followed, the Boeotians gathered all their army in line of battle and directed a formidable blow at Korinth; but Chabrias with the Athenians advanced out of the city, took his station on superior terrain and withstood the attack of the enemy. The Boeotians, however, relying upon the hardihood of their bodies and their experience in continuous warfare, expected to worst the Athenians by sheer might, but Chabrias' corps, having the advantage of superior ground in the struggle and of abundant supplies from the city, slew some of the attackers and severely wounded others. The Boeotians, having suffered many losses and being unable to accomplish anything, beat a retreat. So Chabrias won great admiration for his courage and shrewdness as a general and got rid of the enemy in this fashion.

=== Oropos Affair ===
Chabrias is not known to participate extensively in Athenian politics, but he was at times associated with Callistratus, one of the leading politicians of this time. For example, Iphikrates had selected both men to join him in his expedition to Corcyra in 372. (Xenophon vi.2.39) Then, in 366, the two men incurred the enmity of certain partisans in the Athenian assembly by counseling the city not to go to war over the Theban acquisition of the coastal village of Oropos in the northwest corner of Attica. Control of the area had shifted back and forth between Athens and Thebes for generations, and at the time in question was an Athenian territory. Certain exiles from the village had induced Themison, tyrant of Eretria in Euboea, to take control so they could return. Athens sent a regiment out to take it back, but by the time it got there, Thebes had stepped in and taken it for themselves.

In the later Assembly debate over to what to do, Kallistratos and Chabrias advised restraint, expecting that the situation could be resolved diplomatically. When Thebes refused to cede control, the two men were brought up on charges. The specifics are not clear, but in ancient Athens anyone could sue anyone for almost anything. The eloquence of Callistratus saved them this time, but five years later Kallistratos was indicted a second time and condemned to death in absentia, he having left town before the trial.

In the late summer of 362 Chabrias once again went to the aid of an Egyptian king (Tachos) in revolt against Persia. This time he joined the aging Spartan King Agesilaos who had been sent by Sparta to command the infantry. Chabrias was to command the king's navy. As before, Chabrias went on his own, without the sanction of the Athenian assembly, but this time no embarrassing recall was forthcoming. During this affair, Agesilaos transferred his allegiance to a rival for the Egyptian throne, Nektanebos, and Tachos was later compelled to flee to Persia and seek asylum with Artaxerxes. What Chabrias did during this internal revolt is not recorded.

There is a brief mention in an oration of Demosthenes of Chabrias being sent on a mission to the Chersonese in 359/8 with one vessel in an abortive attempt to help an Athenodoros, an ally who capitulated to his enemies for lack of funds from Athens.

=== Social War (357–355 BC) and the death of Chabrias ===
In 357 four members of the Athenian Confederacy (Byzantium, Rhodes, Chios, and Kos) suffered internal revolts in which their democratic governments were overtaken by oligarchies, the reported motivation being the heavy-handed way Athens was managing the league. Each city then announced it was seceding from the Confederacy. In the initial action of the war, the Athenian admiral Chares was sent with a fleet to the various cities and set things right. Chabrias was appointed trierarch for this expedition. Cornelius Nepos provides the most complete description of what happened:

Chabrias lost his life in the Social War, in the following manner. The Athenians were besieging Chios; Chabrias was on board the fleet as a private man, but had more influence than all who were in command; and the soldiers looked up to him more than to those who were over them. This circumstance hastened his death; for while he was anxious to be the first to enter the harbor, and ordered the captain to steer the vessel towards it, he was the occasion of his own death, since, after he had made his way into it, the other ships did not follow. Upon which, being surrounded by a body of the enemy, his ship, while he was fighting with the utmost bravery, was struck with the beak of one of the enemy's vessels, and began to sink. Though he might have escaped from the danger, if he had cast himself into the sea, for the fleet of the Athenians was at hand to take him up as he swam, he chose rather to die, than to throw away his arms and abandon the vessel in which he had sailed. The others would not act in a similar manner, but gained a place of safety by swimming. He, on the other hand, thinking an honorable death preferable to a dishonorable life, was killed with the weapons of the enemy, while he was fighting hand to hand with them.
