= 368th =

368th may refer to:

- 368th Bombardment Squadron, inactive United States Air Force unit
- 368th Expeditionary Air Support Operations Group (368 EASOG) is a support unit of the United States Air Force
- 368th Fighter Group or 136th Airlift Wing, unit of the Texas Air National Guard, stationed at Naval Air Station Joint Reserve Base Fort Worth
- 368th Fighter Squadron or 165th Airlift Squadron, unit of the Kentucky Air National Guard 123d Airlift Wing located at Louisville Air National Guard Base
- 368th Military Intelligence Battalion (United States) provides training to meet the operational intelligence requirements of Combatant Commands and the United States Intelligence Community

== See also ==
- 368 (number)
- 368, the year 368 (CCCLXVIII) of the Julian calendar
- 368 BC
