= Leptines =

4th-century BC Athenian orator

Leptines (Ancient Greek: Λεπτίνης) was an Athenian orator. He is known as the proposer of a law that no Athenian, whether citizen or resident alien (with the sole exception of the descendants of Harmodius and Aristogeiton), should be exempt from the public charges (leitourgiai) for the state festivals.

The object was to provide funds for the festivals and public spectacles at a time when both the treasury and the citizens generally were short of money. It was further asserted that many of the recipients of immunity were really unworthy of it. Against this law Demosthenes delivered (354 BC) his well-known speech "Against Leptines" in support of the proposal of Ctesippus that all the cases of immunity should be carefully investigated. Great stress is laid on the reputation for ingratitude and breach of faith which the abolition of immunities would bring upon the state.

Besides, the law itself had been passed unconstitutionally, for an existing law confirmed these privileges, and by the constitution of Solon no law could be enacted until any existing law which it contravened had been repealed. The law was probably condemned. Nothing further is known of Leptines.

See the edition of the speech by J. E. Sandys (1890).
