= 366 BC =

366 BC in various calendars
Gregorian calendar	366 BC; CCCLXVI BC
Ab urbe condita	388
Ancient Egypt era	XXX dynasty, 15
Pharaoh	Nectanebo I, 15
Ancient Greek Olympiad (summer)	103rd Olympiad, year 3
Assyrian calendar	4385
Balinese saka calendar	N/A
Bengali calendar	−959 – −958
Berber calendar	585
Buddhist calendar	179
Burmese calendar	−1003
Byzantine calendar	5143–5144
Chinese calendar	甲寅年 (Wood Tiger); 2332 or 2125 — to — 乙卯年 (Wood Rabbit); 2333 or 2126
Coptic calendar	−649 – −648
Discordian calendar	801
Ethiopian calendar	−373 – −372
Hebrew calendar	3395–3396
- Hindu calendars
Vikram Samvat	−309 – −308
Shaka Samvat	N/A
Kali Yuga	2735–2736
Holocene calendar	9635
Iranian calendar	987 BP – 986 BP
Islamic calendar	1017 BH – 1016 BH
Javanese calendar	N/A
Julian calendar	N/A
Korean calendar	1968
Minguo calendar	2277 before ROC 民前2277年
Nanakshahi calendar	−1833
Thai solar calendar	177–178
Tibetan calendar	ཤིང་ཕོ་སྟག་ལོ་ (male Wood-Tiger) −239 or −620 or −1392 — to — ཤིང་མོ་ཡོས་ལོ་ (female Wood-Hare) −238 or −619 or −1391

Year 366 BC was a year of the pre-Julian Roman calendar. At the time, it was known as the Year of the Consulship of Mamercinus and Lateranus (or, less frequently, year 388 Ab urbe condita). The denomination 366 BC for this year has been used since the early medieval period, when the Anno Domini calendar era became the prevalent method in Europe for naming years.

== Events ==
=== By place ===
==== Persian Empire ====
- In Persia, a number of satraps of King Artaxerxes II begin a revolt, in alliance with Athens, Sparta, and Egypt, that lasts until 358 BC.

==== Greece ====
- Athens founds the town of Kos on the island of Kos in the Aegean Sea.
- Theban leader, Epaminondas, returns to the Peloponnesus for a third time, seeking to secure the allegiance of the states of Achaea. Although no army dares to challenge him in the field, the democratic governments he establishes there are short-lived, as pro-Spartan aristocrats soon return to the cities, reestablish the oligarchies, and bind their cities ever more closely to Sparta.
- Thebes makes peace with Sparta and then turns its attention on Athens, which is trying to revive its maritime empire and is interfering in Macedonian dynastic quarrels.
- Thebes captures the city of Oropus.

==== Sicily ====
- The experiment by Dion (brother-in-law of Dionysius I) and Plato to educate the new ruler of Syracuse, Dionysius II, in the practical application of Plato's philosophical principles fails and Dion and Plato are banished from Syracuse.

==== Roman Republic ====
- The use of military tribunes with consular power is abandoned permanently and the dual consulship is restored. A new magistracy is established, which is called the praetorship. Its holder, the praetor, is elected annually by the Assembly and takes charge of civil matters, thus relieving the consuls of this responsibility. The praetor is regarded as a junior colleague of the consuls. Nevertheless, the praetor can command an army, convene a Senate or an assembly, as well as exercise the consular functions.
- Two additional aediles, called curule ("higher") aediles, are created in the Roman hierarchy. These are at first patricians; but those of the next year are plebeians and so on year by year alternately. They are elected in the assembly of the tribes, with the consul presiding.

=== By topic ===
==== Arts ====
- The Abduction of Persephone, detail of a wall painting in Tomb I (Small Tomb) in Vergina, Macedonia, is made (approximate date).
