= Ctesippus =

Set of figures in Greek mythology

The name Ctesippus may also refer to a character in Plato's Euthydemus and Lysis, and to a historical figure, see Leptines and Against Leptines.

In Greek mythology, the name Ctesippus (/tɪˈsɪp.əs/; Ancient Greek: Κτήσιππος, romanized: Ktesippos, lit. 'possessing horses' or 'gaining horses') may refer to:

- Ctessipus, son of Heracles by Deianira. He was the father of Thrasyanor, grandfather of Antimachus and great-grandfather of Deiphontes. Thersander, son of Agamedidas, is also given as his great-grandson.
- Ctesippus, another son of Heracles by Astydameia the daughter of Amyntor or Ormenius.
- Ctessipus, two of the suitors of Penelope, one from Same, and the other from Ithaca. The rich and "lawless" Ctesippus of Same, son of Polytherses, who has 'fabulous wealth' appears in the Odyssey; he mocks the disguised Odysseus and hurls a bull's hoof at him as a 'gift', mocking xenia, though Odysseus dodges this. Telemachus says if he had hit the guest, he would have run Ctesippus through with his spear. Later, in the battle between Odysseus and the suitors, Ctesippus attempts to kill Eumaeus with a spear, but misses due to Athena's intervention, though scratches Eumaeus's shoulder, and is thereupon himself killed by Philoetius, who thus avenges the disrespect towards his master.
