= Ormenius (mythology) =

In Greek mythology, Ormenius (Ancient Greek: Ὀρμένιος, romanized: Ormenios, lit. 'impetuous', 'eager' or 'one who sets in motion') may refer to various characters:

- Ormenius, a warrior in the army of Dionysus during the Indian War. He was killed by Deriades, king of the Indians.
- Ormenius, king of Pelasgiotis killed by Heracles. He had a daughter Astydamia, who had a son Ctesippus with Heracles.
- Ormenius, one of the Suitors of Penelope who came from Dulichium along with other 56 wooers. He, with the other suitors, was killed by Odysseus with the assistance of Eumaeus, Philoetius, and Telemachus.
