= Chares of Athens =

4th-century BCE Athenian politician and general

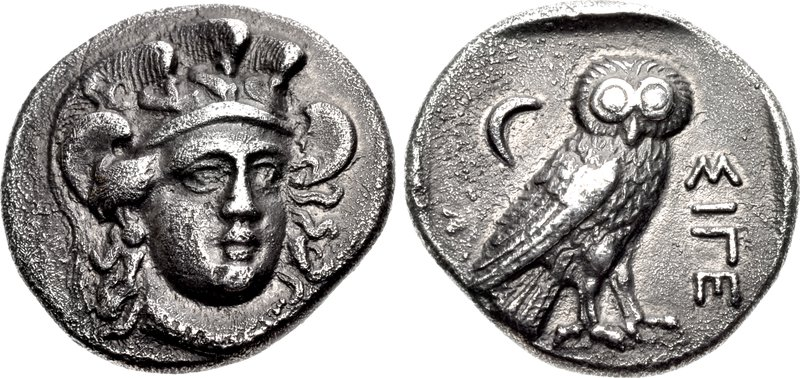
Coinage of Sigeion, Troas, Asia Minor, struck under Chares.

Chares of Athens (Ancient Greek: Χάρης ὁ Ἀθηναῖος) was a 4th-century BC Athenian military commander (Strategos), who for a number of years was one of Athens's foremost commanders. He was also a well connected politician enabling him to procure the commands he desired, commands he primarily used to enrich himself and his adherents.

== First campaigns ==
Chares is first mentioned in historical records in 367 BC, when he was sent to the aid of the city of Phlius. The city was hard pressed by the Arcadians and Argives, assisted by the Theban commander at Sicyon. His forces were successful in relieving the city. (It was during this campaign that Aeschines, the orator, first distinguished himself.)

After his successful campaign, Chares was recalled to take the command against Oropus; and the recovery of their harbour by the Sicyonians from the Spartan garrison, immediately on his departure, shows how important his presence had been for the support of the Spartan cause in the north of the Peloponnese.

In 361 BC, Chares was appointed to succeed the Athenian admiral Leosthenes, following Leosthenes's defeat by Alexander of Pherae. Sailing to Corcyra, he supported the city's oligarchic party. With Chares's support the oligarchs gained control, unfortunately they achieved it only by a lot of bloodshed breeding animosity amongst Corcyra's democratic parties. He also failed to maintain good relations with the oligarchs themselves. As a result, the island was lost to the Athenians when the Social War broke out.

In 358 BC Chares was sent to Thrace as general with full power (a strategos). He was able to force Charidemus to ratify the treaty which he had made with Athenodorus. In the following year, with the start of the Social War, he was appointed one of Athens's generals. In the second campaign of the War in 356 BC, following the death of Chabrias, he had joint command of the Athenian forces with Iphicrates and Timotheus.

According to Diodorus, when, despite Chares's eagerness to do so, his colleagues refused to fight the enemy because of a bad storm, Chares reported their failings to Athens, and they were recalled and subsequently brought to trial. In contrast to Diodorus, Cornelius Nepos considered that Chares did attack the enemy in spite of the weather, but was defeated. Then, in order to protect himself, he accused his colleagues of not supporting him. In the subsequent prosecution he was aided by Aristophon.

Being left in the sole command, and needing funds, which he was unwilling to seek from Athens, Chares and his men entered the service of Artabazus, the rebellious satrap of Hellespontine Phrygia. The Athenians at first approved of this action, but afterwards ordered him to drop his connection with Artabazus following complaints from the Persian king Artaxerxes III Ochus. In this regard, it is probable that the threat from Artaxerxes III to support the confederates against Athens hastened the termination of the Social War. The quick end to the war was supported by Eubulus and Isocrates, but opposed by Chares and his party.

In 353 BC, Chares was sent against Sestus, which, along with Cardia, had been unwilling to submit to Athens notwithstanding the ceding of the Thracian Chersonese to Athens in 357 BC. He took the town, massacred the men, and sold the women and children for slaves.

== Wars against the Macedonians ==
In the Olynthian War (349 BC), he was appointed general of the mercenaries sent from Athens to the aid of Olynthus; but he seems to have achieved very little . His command was then passed to Charidemus, who in the ensuing year (348 BC) was replaced by Chares again. During his second campaign he achieved a small victory against king Philip's mercenaries, and celebrated it by a feast given to the Athenians with a portion of the money which had been sacrilegiously taken from Delphi, and some of which had found its way into his hands.

On his euthyne (the public scrutiny to which every public officer was submitted after having discharged his duties) he was impeached by Cephisodotus, who complained, that "he was endeavouring to give his account after having got the people tight by the throat",. In 346 BC he was in command of Athenian forces again, this time in Thrace. When the Macedonian king, Philip, was preparing to march against Cersobleptes, complaints arrived at Athens from the Chersonese that Chares had withdrawn and was nowhere to be found. Athens was obliged to send a squadron in search of him with the extraordinary message, that "the Athenians were surprised that, while Philip was marching against the Chersonese, they did not know where their general and his forces were." It is likely that he had been engaged in some private expedition seeking plunder. In the same year, and before the departure of the second embassy from Athens to Macedonia to discuss peace, a dispatch arrived from Chares discussing the hopeless condition of the affairs of Cersobleptes.

After this, there are no historical records about Chares for several years, during which he probably resided at Sigeion, which, according to Theopompus, was his favourite residence. But in a speech by Demosthenes delivered in 341 BC, Chares is spoken of as possessing much influence at that time in the Athenian councils. Therefore, it is possible that Chares may have been one of those who authorized and defended the proceedings of Diopeithes against king Philip in Thrace. In 340 BC, he was appointed to the command of the force which was sent to aid Byzantium against Philip; but he was distrusted by the Byzantines, and they refused to receive him. Chares was ineffective against the Macedonians—his only exploits it is said were against the allies of Athens, whom he appears to plundered unscrupulously. He was accordingly superseded by Phocion, who was very successful.

In 338 BC, Chares was sent to aid Amphissa against Philip. He was defeated by Philip together with the Theban general, Proxenus. Of this defeat, which is mentioned by Aeschines, Demosthenes in his reply says nothing, but speaks of two battles in which the Athenians were victorious. In the same year, Chares was one of the commanders of the Athenian forces at the Battle of Chaeronea. Despite the disastrous result, Chares escaped censure, or at least prosecution, though Lysicles, one of his colleagues, was tried and condemned to death.

Chares is mentioned by Arrian among the Athenian orators and generals whom Alexander required to be surrendered to him in 335 BC, although Demades persuaded Alexander not to press the demand against any but Charidemus. Plutarch, however, omits the name of Chares in his list.

When Alexander invaded Asia Minor in 334 BC, Chares was living at Sigeion, and he is mentioned again by Arrian as one of those who came to meet the king and pay their respects to him on his way to Troy. After this Chares was a mercenary commander for Darius Codomannus at Mytilene, which had been captured in 333 BC by Pharnabazus and Autophradates, but which Chares was compelled to surrender in the ensuing year.

After this event, no further information is available about Chares, but it is likely that he ended his days at Sigeion.

== Appraisal ==
As a general, Chares has been charged with rashness, especially in the needless exposure of his own person; this said he appears to have been, during the greater portion of his career, the best commander that Athens had. In politics, we see him connected throughout with Demosthenes. Morally he must have been an incubus on any party to which he attached himself, notwithstanding the assistance he might sometimes render it through the orators whom he is said to have kept constantly in pay. His alleged profligacy, which was measureless, he unblushingly avowed and gloried in, openly ridiculing the austere Phocion. His bad faith passed into a proverb; and his rapacity was extraordinary, even amidst the system then prevailing, when the citizens of Athens would neither fight their own battles nor pay the men who fought them, and her commanders had to support their mercenaries as best they could. His triumphal career under the banners of the republic may be seen as a symptom of the decline of Athens's values and power.
