= 446 BC =

446 BC in various calendars
- Gregorian calendar: 446 BC; CDXLVI BC
- Ab urbe condita: 308
- Ancient Egypt era: XXVII dynasty, 80
- Pharaoh: Artaxerxes I of Persia, 20
- Ancient Greek Olympiad (summer): 83rd Olympiad, year 3
- Assyrian calendar: 4305
- Balinese saka calendar: N/A
- Bengali calendar: −1039 – −1038
- Berber calendar: 505
- Buddhist calendar: 99
- Burmese calendar: −1083
- Byzantine calendar: 5063–5064
- Chinese calendar: 甲午年 (Wood Horse); 2252 or 2045 — to — 乙未年 (Wood Goat); 2253 or 2046
- Coptic calendar: −729 – −728
- Discordian calendar: 721
- Ethiopian calendar: −453 – −452
- Hebrew calendar: 3315–3316
- Hindu calendars
- Vikram Samvat: −389 – −388
- Shaka Samvat: N/A
- Kali Yuga: 2655–2656
- Holocene calendar: 9555
- Iranian calendar: 1067 BP – 1066 BP
- Islamic calendar: 1100 BH – 1099 BH
- Javanese calendar: N/A
- Julian calendar: N/A
- Korean calendar: 1888
- Minguo calendar: 2357 before ROC 民前2357年
- Nanakshahi calendar: −1913
- Thai solar calendar: 97–98
- Tibetan calendar: ཤིང་ཕོ་རྟ་ལོ་ (male Wood-Horse) −319 or −700 or −1472 — to — ཤིང་མོ་ལུག་ལོ་ (female Wood-Sheep) −318 or −699 or −1471

Year 446 BC was a year of the pre-Julian Roman calendar. At the time, it was known as the Year of the Consulship of Barbatus and Fusus (or, less frequently, year 308 Ab urbe condita). The denomination 446 BC for this year has been used since the early medieval period, when the Anno Domini calendar era became the prevalent method in Europe for naming years.

== Events ==
=== By place ===
==== Greece ====
- Achaea achieves its independence from Athens, while Euboea, crucial to Athenian control of the sea and food supplies, revolts against Athens. Pericles crosses over to Euboea with his troops.
- Megara joins the revolt against Athens. The strategic importance of Megara is immediately demonstrated by the appearance, for the first time in 12 years, of a Spartan army under King Pleistoanax in Attica. The threat from the Spartan army leads Pericles to arrange, by bribery and by negotiation, that Athens will give up its mainland possessions and confine itself to a largely maritime empire.
- The Spartan army retires, so Pericles crosses back to Euboea with 50 ships and 5,000 soldiers, cracking down any opposition. He punishes the landowners of Chalcis, who lose their properties, while the residents of Histiaea are uprooted and replaced by 2,000 Athenian settlers.
- After hearing that the Spartan army had accepted bribes from Pericles, Pleistoanax, the King of Sparta, is impeached by the citizens of Sparta, but flees to exile in Arcadia. His military adviser, Cleandridas also flees and is condemned to death in his absence.

==== Sicily ====
- Ducetius, the Hellenised leader of the Siculi, an ancient people of Sicily, returns from exile in Corinth to Sicily and colonises Cale Acte on the north coast with Greek and Siculi settlers.
- Acragas declares war on Syracuse because of the return of Ducetius and is defeated by Syracuse in the Battle of the Himera River.

==== Roman Republic ====
- In the Battle of Corbione, Titus Quinctius Capitolinus Barbatus leads Roman troops to a victory over the Aequi of north-east Latium and the Volsci of southern Latium.

== Births ==
- Aristophanes, Greek playwright (approximate year) (d. c. 385 BC)
- Marcus Furius Camillus, Roman soldier and statesman (traditional date) (d. 365 BC)

== Deaths ==
- Cleinias, a close relative of Roman politician and military commander Alcibiades. (approximate year) (b. disputed)
