= 292 BC =

292 BC in various calendars
- Gregorian calendar: 292 BC; CCXCII BC
- Ab urbe condita: 462
- Ancient Egypt era: XXXIII dynasty, 32
- Pharaoh: Ptolemy I Soter, 32
- Ancient Greek Olympiad (summer): 122nd Olympiad (victor)¹
- Assyrian calendar: 4459
- Balinese saka calendar: N/A
- Bengali calendar: −885 – −884
- Berber calendar: 659
- Buddhist calendar: 253
- Burmese calendar: −929
- Byzantine calendar: 5217–5218
- Chinese calendar: 戊辰年 (Earth Dragon); 2406 or 2199 — to — 己巳年 (Earth Snake); 2407 or 2200
- Coptic calendar: −575 – −574
- Discordian calendar: 875
- Ethiopian calendar: −299 – −298
- Hebrew calendar: 3469–3470
- Hindu calendars
- Vikram Samvat: −235 – −234
- Shaka Samvat: N/A
- Kali Yuga: 2809–2810
- Holocene calendar: 9709
- Iranian calendar: 913 BP – 912 BP
- Islamic calendar: 941 BH – 940 BH
- Javanese calendar: N/A
- Julian calendar: N/A
- Korean calendar: 2042
- Minguo calendar: 2203 before ROC 民前2203年
- Nanakshahi calendar: −1759
- Seleucid era: 20/21 AG
- Thai solar calendar: 251–252
- Tibetan calendar: ས་ཕོ་འབྲུག་ལོ་ (male Earth-Dragon) −165 or −546 or −1318 — to — ས་མོ་སྦྲུལ་ལོ་ (female Earth-Snake) −164 or −545 or −1317

Year 292 BC was a year of the pre-Julian Roman calendar. At the time it was known as the Year of the Consulship of Gurges and Scaeva (or, less frequently, year 462 Ab urbe condita). The denomination 292 BC for this year has been used since the early medieval period, when the Anno Domini calendar era became the prevalent method in Europe for naming years.

== Events ==
=== By place ===
==== Greece ====
- Lysimachus tries to extend his influence beyond the Danube River, but he is defeated and taken prisoner by the Getae (Dacian) king Dromichaetes (Dromihete). Eventually, Lysimachus is set free and a peace is agreed between the Getae and Lysimachus. This peace agreement is strengthened further by the marriage of Dromichaetes with Lysimachus' daughter.
- While Demetrius Poliorcetes is campaigning in Boeotia, he receives news that Lysimachus, the ruler of Thrace, has been taken prisoner by Dromichaetes. Hoping to seize Lysimachus's territories in Thrace, Demetrius delegates command of his forces in Boeotia to his son, Antigonus and immediately marches north. However, while he is away, the Boeotians rise in rebellion, but are defeated by Antigonus, who bottles them up in the city of Thebes and puts them under siege.
- Antiochus I Soter anointed as king of the Seleucid Syria

==== Roman Republic ====
- Third Samnite War:

- The Samnites reappoint Gavius Pontius, the victor of the Battle of Caudine Forks, as general, and in Campania he defeats the consul Quintus Fabius Maximus Gurges. However, Fabius is joined by his father, Q. Fabius Maximus Rullianus, as legate and de facto general, and they defeat Pontius in battle and capture the general and his camp. They then capture several towns of the Pentri, a prominent tribe of the Samnites.
- The Falisci renew their efforts against Rome. However, the consul Decimus Junius Brutus Scaeva, assisted by former consul Spurius Carvilius Maximus, defeats them in an engagement and ravages their territory and those of the Etruscans. The Falisci and Etruscans again sue for peace, and this ends the Etruscan theatre of the Third Samnite War.

==== China ====
- General Bai Qi of the State of Qin defeats the State of Wei in a major battle and captures cities in Wei. Wei cedes control of 61 towns and cities.
