= 436 BC =

436 BC in various calendars
- Gregorian calendar: 436 BC; CDXXXVI BC
- Ab urbe condita: 318
- Ancient Egypt era: XXVII dynasty, 90
- Pharaoh: Artaxerxes I of Persia, 30
- Ancient Greek Olympiad (summer): 86th Olympiad (victor)¹
- Assyrian calendar: 4315
- Balinese saka calendar: N/A
- Bengali calendar: −1029 – −1028
- Berber calendar: 515
- Buddhist calendar: 109
- Burmese calendar: −1073
- Byzantine calendar: 5073–5074
- Chinese calendar: 甲辰年 (Wood Dragon); 2262 or 2055 — to — 乙巳年 (Wood Snake); 2263 or 2056
- Coptic calendar: −719 – −718
- Discordian calendar: 731
- Ethiopian calendar: −443 – −442
- Hebrew calendar: 3325–3326
- Hindu calendars
- Vikram Samvat: −379 – −378
- Shaka Samvat: N/A
- Kali Yuga: 2665–2666
- Holocene calendar: 9565
- Iranian calendar: 1057 BP – 1056 BP
- Islamic calendar: 1089 BH – 1088 BH
- Javanese calendar: N/A
- Julian calendar: N/A
- Korean calendar: 1898
- Minguo calendar: 2347 before ROC 民前2347年
- Nanakshahi calendar: −1903
- Thai solar calendar: 107–108
- Tibetan calendar: ཤིང་ཕོ་འབྲུག་ལོ་ (male Wood-Dragon) −309 or −690 or −1462 — to — ཤིང་མོ་སྦྲུལ་ལོ་ (female Wood-Snake) −308 or −689 or −1461

Year 436 BC was a year of the pre-Julian Roman calendar. At the time, it was known as the Year of the Consulship of Crassus and Cornelius (or, less frequently, year 318 Ab urbe condita). The denomination 436 BC for this year has been used since the early medieval period, when the Anno Domini calendar era became the prevalent method in Europe for naming years.

== Events ==
=== By place ===
==== Greece ====
- Following Pericles' visit to the Black Sea, a large Athenian colony is founded at Amphipolis. This is disconcertingly close to an outpost of Corinthian influence at Potidaea in the Chalcidice. Corinth feels it is being indirectly pressured by Athens.

== Births ==
- Isocrates, Athenian orator (d. 338 BC)
- Artaxerxes II, king of Persia (approximate date) (d. 358 BC)

== Deaths ==
- Zengcius, Chinese philosopher (b. 505 BC)
