= Themison of Eretria =

Themison (Ancient Greek: Θεμίσων; lived 4th century BC) was a tyrant of Eretria who in 366 BC assisted the exiles of Oropus in recovering possession of their native city. They succeeded in occupying it by surprise, but the Athenians having marched against them with their whole force, Themison was unable to cope with their power, and called in the Thebans to his assistance, who received possession of the city as a deposit, but afterwards refused to give it up.
