= 358 BC =

358 BC in various calendars
Gregorian calendar	358 BC; CCCLVIII BC
Ab urbe condita	396
Ancient Egypt era	XXX dynasty, 23
Pharaoh	Nectanebo II, 3
Ancient Greek Olympiad (summer)	105th Olympiad, year 3
Assyrian calendar	4393
Balinese saka calendar	N/A
Bengali calendar	−951 – −950
Berber calendar	593
Buddhist calendar	187
Burmese calendar	−995
Byzantine calendar	5151–5152
Chinese calendar	壬戌年 (Water Dog); 2340 or 2133 — to — 癸亥年 (Water Pig); 2341 or 2134
Coptic calendar	−641 – −640
Discordian calendar	809
Ethiopian calendar	−365 – −364
Hebrew calendar	3403–3404
- Hindu calendars
Vikram Samvat	−301 – −300
Shaka Samvat	N/A
Kali Yuga	2743–2744
Holocene calendar	9643
Iranian calendar	979 BP – 978 BP
Islamic calendar	1009 BH – 1008 BH
Javanese calendar	N/A
Julian calendar	N/A
Korean calendar	1976
Minguo calendar	2269 before ROC 民前2269年
Nanakshahi calendar	−1825
Thai solar calendar	185–186
Tibetan calendar	阳水狗年 (male Water-Dog) −231 or −612 or −1384 — to — 阴水猪年 (female Water-Pig) −230 or −611 or −1383

Year 358 BC was a year of the pre-Julian Roman calendar. At the time, it was known as the Year of the Consulship of Ambustus and Proculus (or, less frequently, year 396 Ab urbe condita). The denomination 358 BC for this year has been used since the early medieval period, when the Anno Domini calendar era became the prevalent method in Europe for naming years.

== Events ==
=== By place ===
==== Persian Empire ====
- Artaxerxes III ("Ochus") succeeds Artaxerxes II as King of Persia and restores central authority over the Persian empire's satraps. To secure his throne he puts to death most of his relatives.

==== Greece ====
- Alexander of Pherae, Despot of Pherae in Thessaly is murdered by his wife's brother at her instigation.
- Cersobleptes, in conjunction with his brothers, Amadocus II and Berisades, inherits the dominions of the Thracian king, Cotys I, following his murder. However, the overall management of Thracian affairs is assumed by the Euboean adventurer, Charidemus, who is connected by marriage with the royal family, and who plays the prominent part in the ensuing negotiations with Athens for the possession of the Thracian Chersonese.

==== Macedonia ====
- Philip II of Macedonia invades the hill tribes of Paeonia and decisively beats them.

==== Roman Republic ====
- The Romans defeat the Volsci, annex most of their territory, and settle it with Roman colonists. The Romans also force the Latin League to renew its close alliance with Rome, an alliance which was weakened by Rome’s defeat at the hands of the Gauls in 390 BC.

== Births ==
- Seleucus I Nicator, Macedonian officer of Alexander the Great and founder of the Seleucid dynasty (d. 281 BC)

== Deaths ==
- Artaxerxes II, King of Persia (b. c. 436 BC)
- Alexander of Pherae, Despot of Pherae in Thessaly, Greece
- Bardyllis, Illyrian king (killed in battle by Phillip of Macedon) (b. c. 448 BC)
- Cotys I, King of Thrace
