= Leosthenes (admiral) =

Athenian admiral

Leosthenes (in Greek Λεωσθένης; died 361 BC) was an Athenian, who commanded a fleet and armament in the Cyclades in 361 BC. Having allowed himself to be surprised by Alexander, tyrant of Pherae, and defeated, with a loss of five triremes and 600 men, he was condemned to death by the Athenians, as a punishment for his ill success.
