= Liturgy (ancient Greece) =

Form of state-established philanthropy in ancient Greece

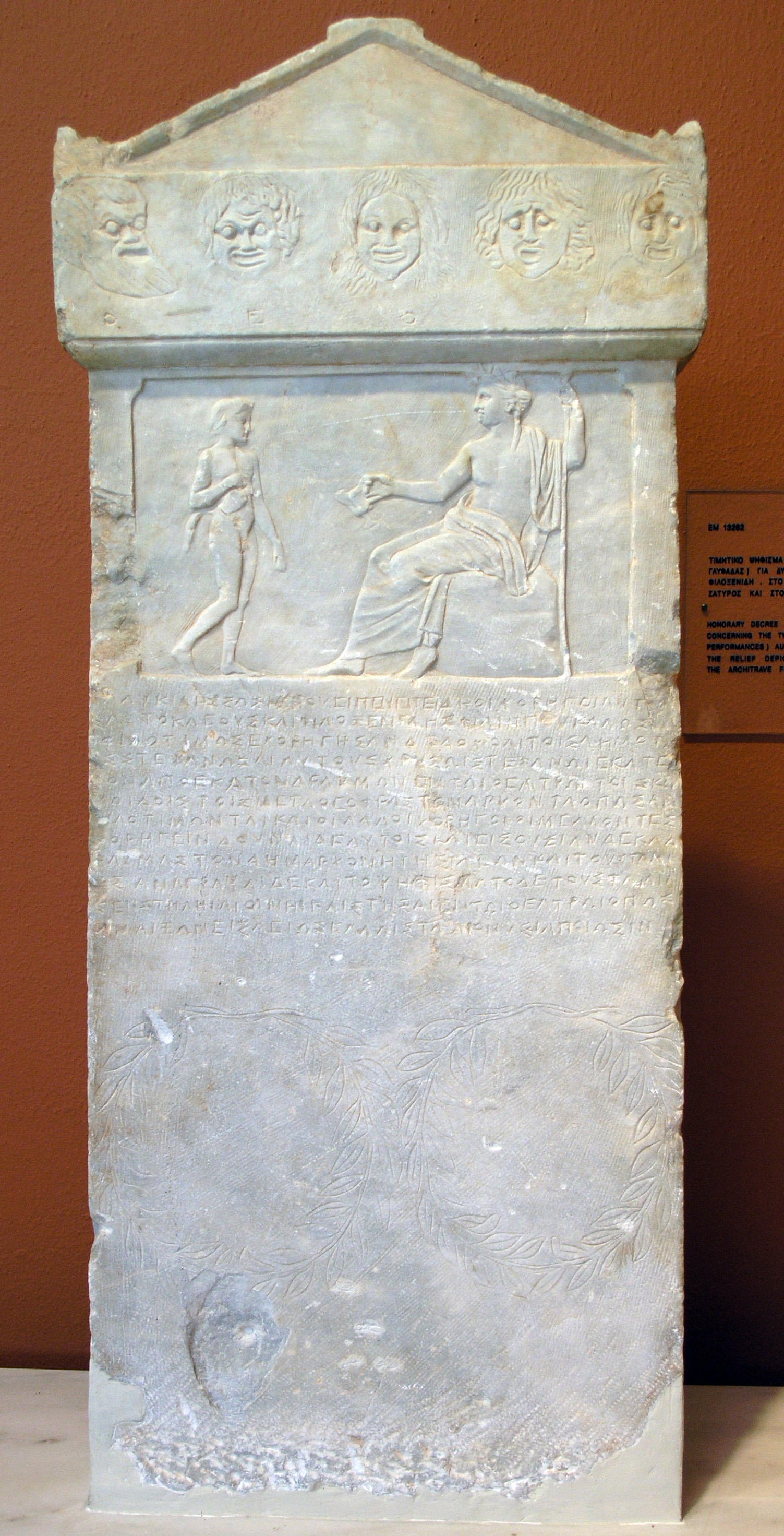
Honorific decree of the deme of Aixone, commemorating the choregoi Auteas and Philoxenides 312/313 BC. Epigraphical Museum of Athens.

The liturgy (Greek: λειτουργία or λῃτουργία, leitourgia, from λαός / Laos, "the people" and the root ἔργο / ergon, "work") was in ancient Greece a public service established by the city-state whereby its richest members (whether citizens or resident aliens) more or less voluntarily financed the State with their personal wealth. It took its legitimacy from the idea that "personal wealth is possessed only through delegation from the city". The liturgical system dates back to the early days of Athenian democracy, and included the constitutional duty of trierarchy, which gradually fell into disuse by the end of the 4th century BC, eclipsed by the development of euergetism in the Hellenistic period. However, a similar system was in force during the Roman empire.

== Principles and types ==
The liturgy was the preferred mode of financing of the Greek city, to the extent that it allowed them to easily associate each public expense with a ready source of revenue. This flexibility makes it particularly suited to the unpredictability of the period. This also explains its widespread use, including in undemocratic cities such as Rhodes. However, no strict uniformity is found in the specific practices of these liturgies, either geographically (from one city to another) or over time (as changing times and circumstances confront the Greek cities).

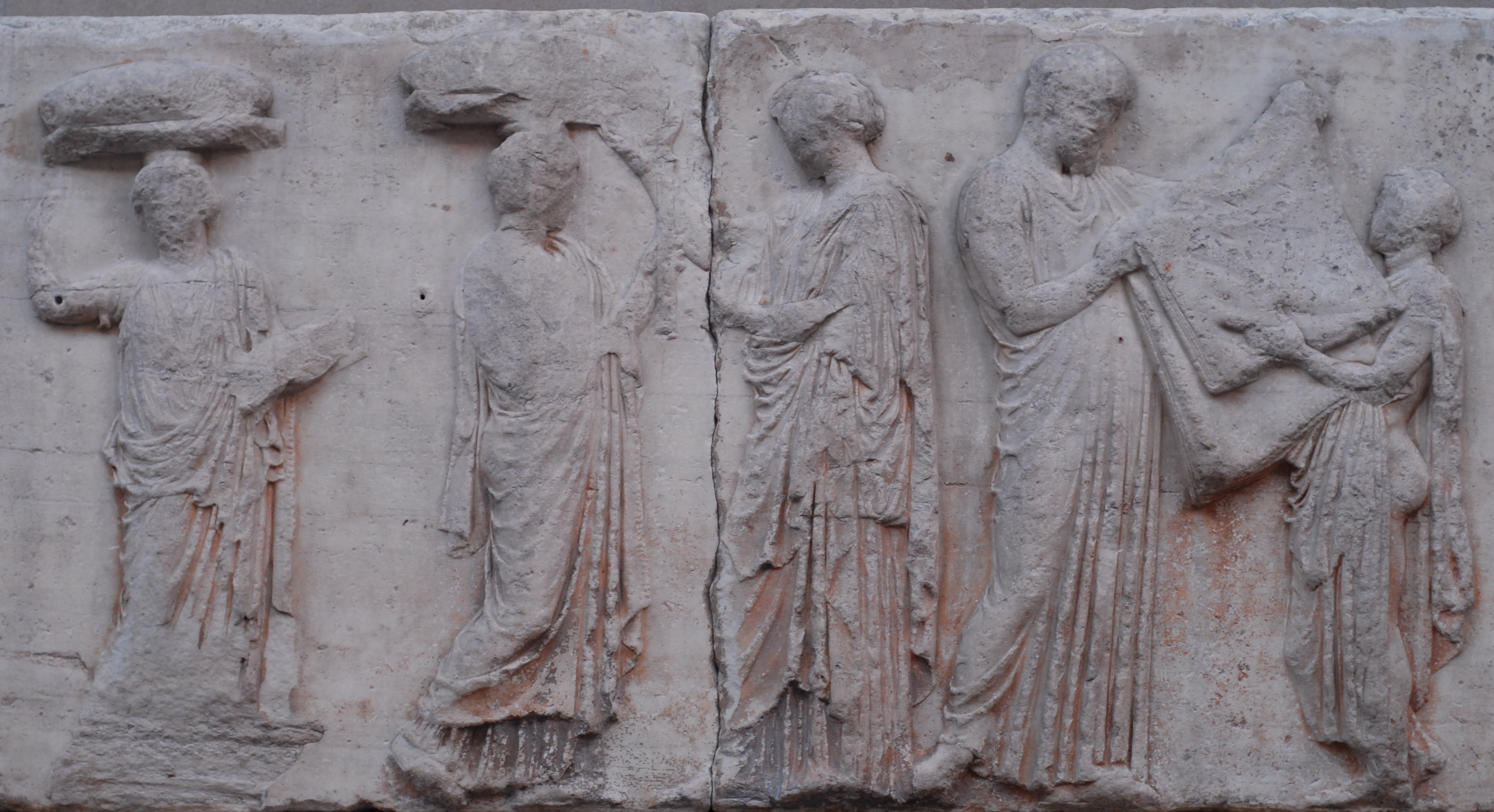
Block V of the eastern Parthenon Frieze, perhaps depicting the arrhephoroi, part of the liturgical calendar.

One can classify liturgies into two main categories. Those associated with the liturgical or agonistic calendar (related to sporting and religious events) are mainly the gymnasiarchia (γυμνασιαρχία), that is to say, the management and financing of the gymnasium, and the choregia (χορηγία), the maintenance of the choir members at the theater for dramatic competitions. There were also many other minor liturgies. The hestiasis (ἑστίασις) was to fund the public dinner of the tribe to which the liturgist belonged; the architheoria (ἀρχιθεωρία) to lead delegations to the four sacred Panhellenic Games;, the arrhephoria (ἀρρηφορία) to cover the cost of the arrhephoroi, four girls of Athenian high society who brought the peplos to the Athena Parthenos, offered her cakes and dedicated white dresses adorned with gold, amongst others. There was considerable creativity in relation to the liturgy, "and with the practicality which characterised their attitude on the subject, the cities were capable of creating new liturgies in accordance with their immediate needs, or of suppressing them temporarily or permanently.". All of these liturgies are part of a religious festival and were recurring (ἐγκύκλιοι).

By comparison, the military liturgies were used only when needed. The main one was the trierarchy, that is to say the equipment and maintenance of a trireme and its crew for a year. The trierarch was also to assume, under the direction of the strategos, the command of the ship, unless he choose to pay a concession and left the fighting to a specialist in which case the office was purely financial. Later the proeisphora was to carry the burden for his tax group or class (symmoriai) advancing the eisphora, the contribution levied from various wealthy social classes to compensate for the costs of the war. It has also been proposed to add to this number the hippotrophia (ἱπποτροφία), namely the maintenance of the horses of the cavalry instituted after the Persian Wars, but it is not certain that this liturgy actually existed.

In 355–354 BC, Demosthenes estimated the number of Athenian calendar liturgies to be sixty per year. This figure is almost certainly seriously understated. The Dionysia alone required 23–32 choregoi, and in the following era we can add ten hestiatores to this number. The Panathenaia required at least 19 liturgists per year as against 30 (or perhaps 40) for the Greater Panathenaic Games which was held every four years; the Lenaia annually had 5 choregoi, and the Thargelia 10. Some liturgists were also required for other religious holidays, which must be added to the theoroi (θεωροὶ) of the Panhellenic Games and the oracle of Delphi. A careful calculation therefore reaches at least 97 civilian liturgists per year in Athens, and at least 118 in years of the Greater Panathenaia.

== Cost and operation ==
=== Becoming a liturgist: method of selection ===
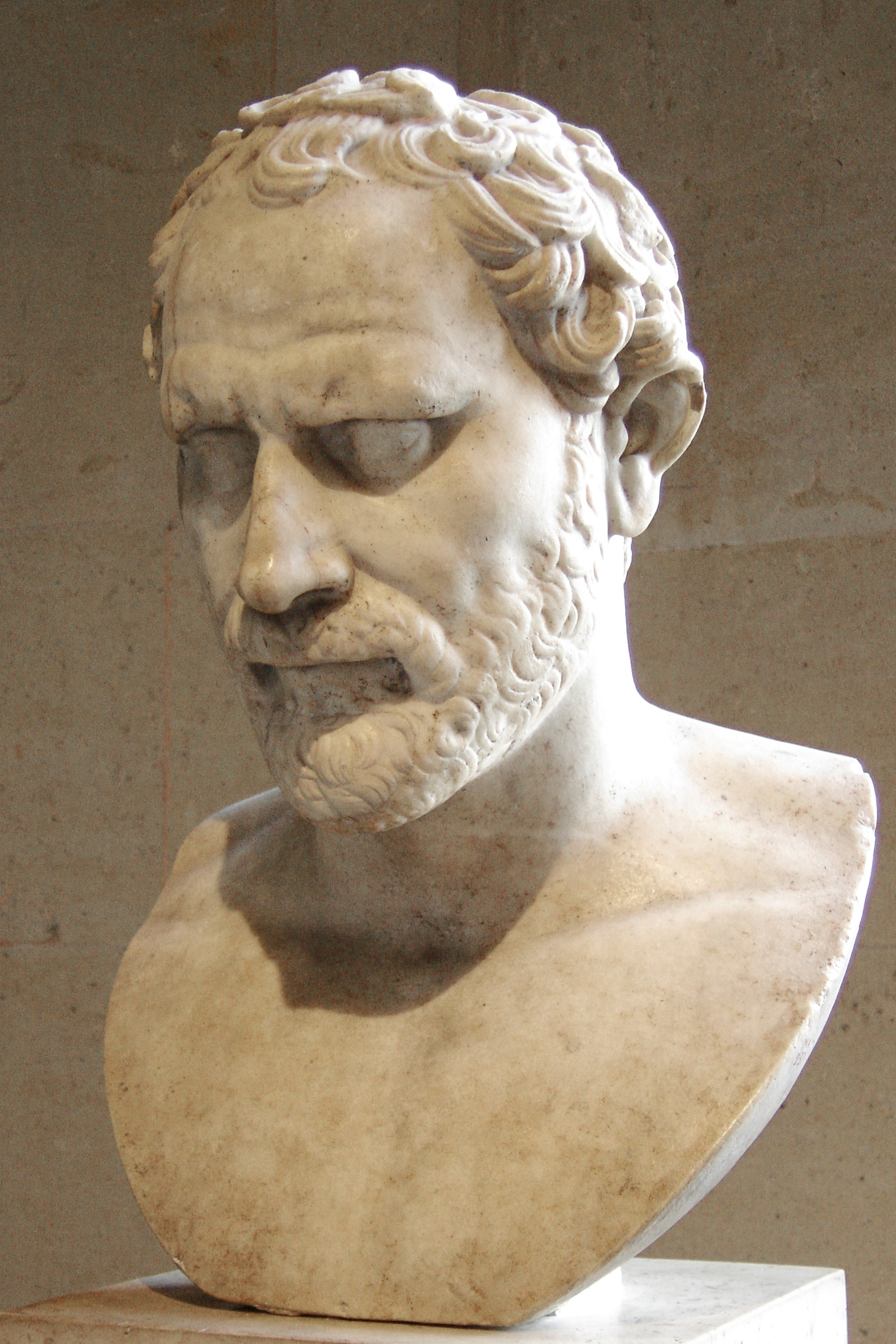
Demosthenes, liturgist several times and one of the main sources on the liturgy, Louvre

The liturgist (λειτουργός / leitourgós), the person in charge of a liturgy, was appointed by the magistrates. They started by asking for volunteers, and then designated those who seemed most able to take charge. In Athens, at the time of Aristotle, it fell to the eponymous archon to designate the religious choregoi for all holidays, except the Lenaia comedy competition, which was in the archon basileus's competency. The trierarchs were selected by the strategos responsible for the symmoriai. The hestiatores, responsible for organizing the common meal of their tribe, were appointed by it. With the exception of the trierarchy, metics made as much financial contribution as citizens, even if it appears that their active participation was relatively marginal.

The choice of a liturgist was based on his wealth, as informally estimated by the city and the liturgists themselves. It does not appear that any "liturgical roll" was established, or that a threshold was set corresponding to the wealth declared by the liturgist, within which everyone would be forced to accept a liturgy. Conversely, citizens of modest wealth could handle certain inexpensive liturgies. In fact, establishing a threshold requirement would have made liturgical expense mandatory instead of voluntary, and caused the city difficulty in the event of widespread impoverishment of its individual members.

However, thresholds of informal wealth beyond which an individual could not shirk his duty were regularly raised in court pleadings: it is clear that in Athens in the 4th century BC a patrimony of 10 talents necessarily makes its holder a member of the "liturgical class". A citizen with a fortune of three talents could also be called upon to take part. It is possible that less expensive liturgies were taken care of by less wealthy individuals, but still conferred the prestige that such a position gave them: "the ideologies of expenditure (megaloprepeia) and of ambition (philotimia) which drive the liturgic ideal, give rise to individual strategies that allow each citizen, in accordance with his financial means and social priorities, to undertake, in a more or less extravagant manner, more or less burdensome liturgies".

In fact, the net worth of each liturgist, and the percentage of his wealth committed to the liturgy, varied greatly, as the "liturgical class" itself varied greatly. The size of the "liturgical class" can be estimated for classical Athens as a range between 300 and 1200 individuals, or as high as 1500–2000 if we take care not to confuse the number of people required to administer the system and the contingent of those who actually took up the liturgy. The number of individuals actively involved is necessarily greater than the total number of liturgies because of the temporary exemptions available and the size of the competitive liturgy system. Therefore, because of changes in wealth (whether related to economic happenstance or the division of inherited wealth) individuals of this "liturgical class" cannot be considered a closed group: it was constantly being renewed, although marginally, by the addition of the "new rich" and the decline of certain families who had previously been wealthy enough to participate.

The practical method of appointing liturgists arose from a social consensus arrived at by the wealthy amongst themselves, which was itself based on "a competitive and luxurious ideology of aristocratic origin, developed in the archaic period, and maintained to its own advantage by the democratic city: [...] the liturgists, far from being manipulated by an administrative structure that forces them to pay, are the active forces in a system which they operate to their own advantage." Specifically, the system was based primarily on the voluntary nature of the role, and the stratification of Athenian society: most of those Athenians to be included on the list of trierarchs had been so before, or were descendants of former trierarchs, with the result that the families providing the trierarchs tended to be the same ones from generation to generation. For the civilian liturgies, including the choregia, it does not appear that there was a similar list. However, the wealthy were eager to volunteer their support, due to peer group pressure and a desire for fame equivalent to their fortunes. Wealthy citizens or resident aliens who were tempted to hide their wealth to escape their duties were deterred by the threat of the "antidosis" (a type of litigation in which a citizen nominated as liturgist tried to compel another to act in his stead), and the harm to reputation that their reluctance to contribute to the public good would cause them within their city.

=== Taking on a liturgy: the financial burden ===
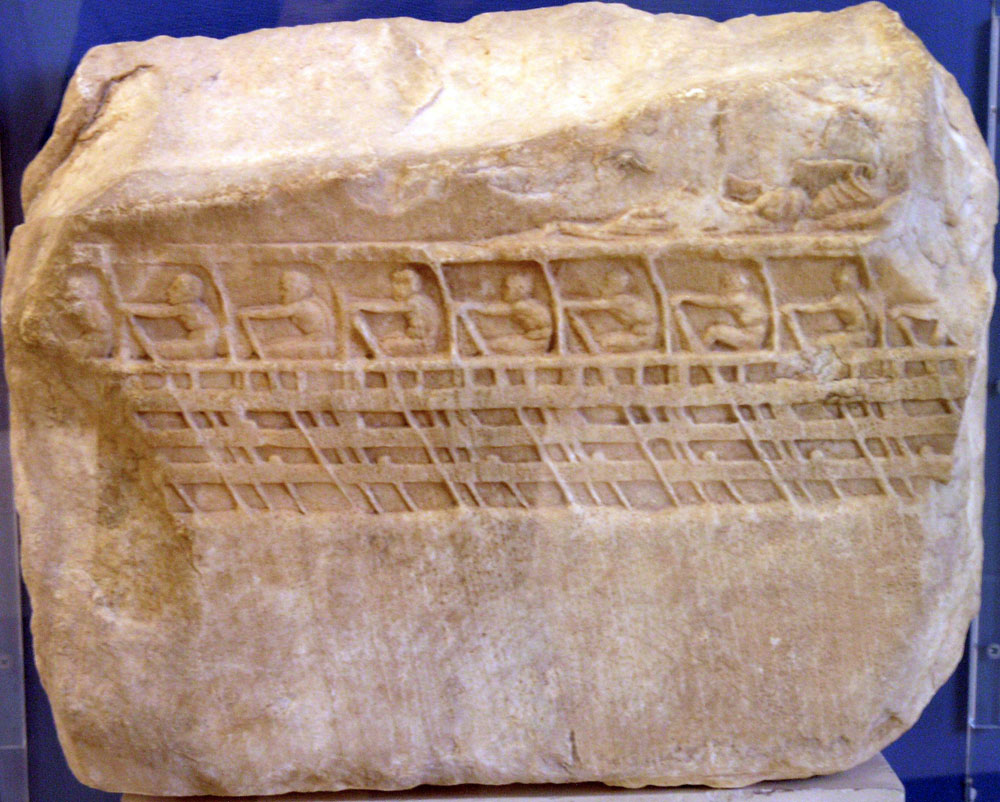
The arming of a trireme, the most expensive of the liturgies (the Lenormant relief, c. 410–400 BC., Acropolis Museum, Athens)

The cost of a liturgy varied greatly according to its nature and prestige. The least expensive was the eutaxia (εὐταξία), known by a single mention, which cost only 50 drachmas; its nature is unknown - it may be related to the Amphiareia Games at Oropos and probably did not last a long time. A dithyrambic chorus at the Panathenaea cost only 300 drachmas. However, a choregia in the Dionysia could cost up to 3000 drachmas, or, "counting the consecration of the tripod, 5000 drachmas".

The trierarchy was among the more expensive liturgies, as determined by the generosity of an individual trierarch, the duration of the military campaign and the initial condition of the vessel entrusted to him. The trierarchy cost a minimum of 2,000–3,000 drachmas, and ranged as high as 4,000 to 6,000. A litigant championed by Lysias claimed that in his seven years as trierarch he spent six talents, and Demosthenes said that "by paying a talent, trierarchs bore the expenses of the trierarchy". The great expense of these liturgies explains the appearance of the syntrierarchy, which placed the financial burden on two individuals, and Periander's establishment in 357 of 20 symmoriai composed of 60 taxpayers each. This move expanded the group responsible for the trierarchy from 300 to 1200 individuals, and sought to make the expense of the trierarchy less onerous. Such expansion, however (which still represents only 2.5% of the total male population of free Athenians), was even more necessary with the reform of the eisphora in 378–377. A new liturgy, the proeisphora, made the wealthiest Athenians responsible for advancing the sum owed by the tax group (symmoriai) to which they belonged. It was then their responsibility to seek reimbursement from the other members of the symmoria, which was not always forthcoming.

Even for the richest Athenians, the liturgy represented a significant expense. Assuming a yield of 8% from the land they held, the poorest liturgists, who had a net worth of ten talents (as Demosthenes did in 360 /59), were forced to devote the greater part of a year's revenue to the trierarchy. Therefore, they were often forced to borrow, to pay for liturgies. In a speech of Lysias, a litigant says, "my father in the whole course of his life, has spent more on the city than for himself and his family - twice what we have now". By comparison, the liturgy that was the least expensive, the choregia of the Panathenaia, represents almost a year's salary of a skilled worker in the 5th century B.C. The most expensive cost more than three times the income of the hoplite class, that is to say the wealth threshold at which one was required to serve as an Athenian soldier.

=== Avoidance ===
==== Exemptions ====
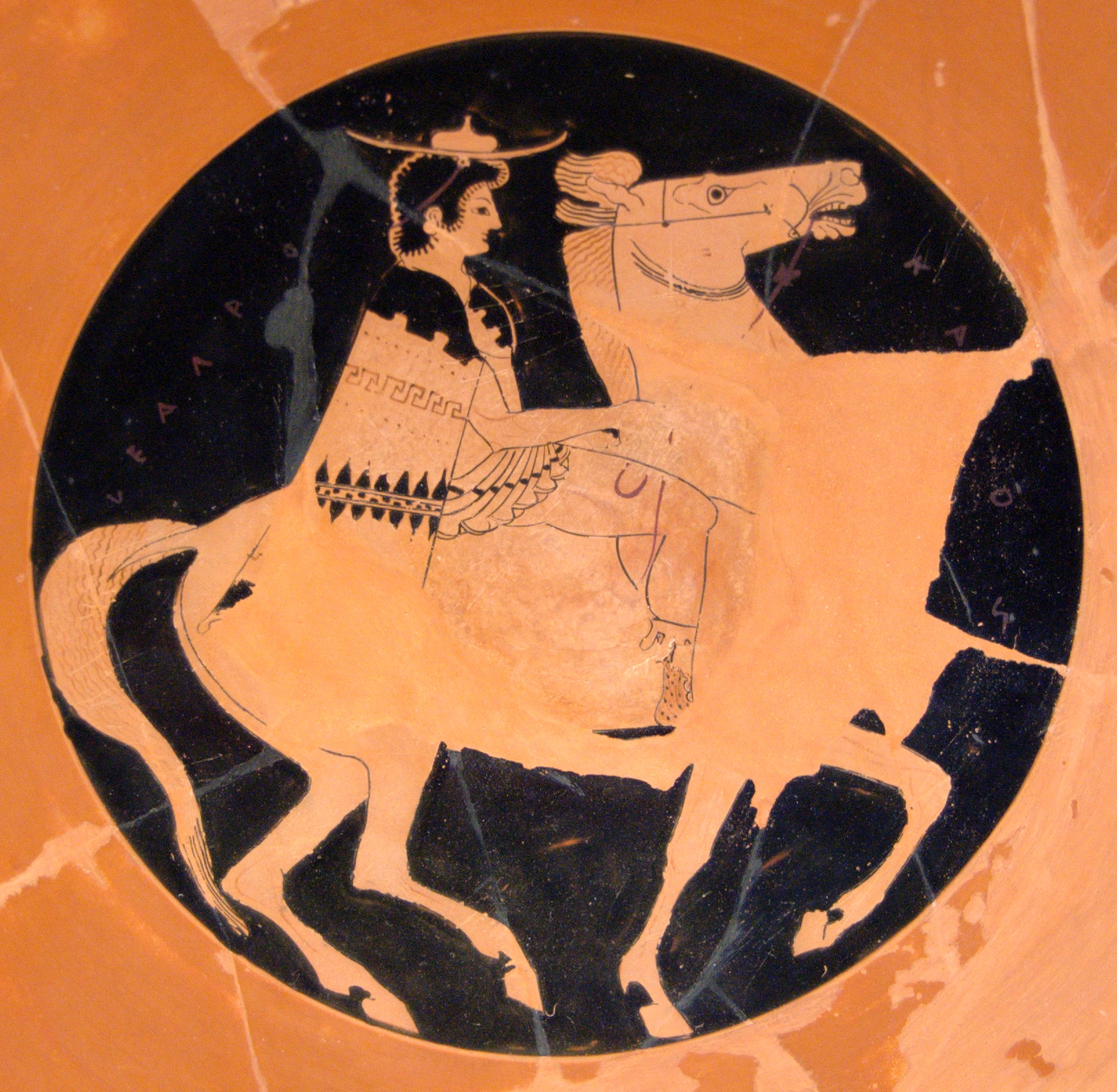
The service in the cavalry, perhaps a reason for exemption (cup by Euphronios, Staatliche Antikensammlungen Munich)

Exemption from serving as a liturgist (σκήψεις / skếpseis) was possible, for orphans; females without legal guardian (epiklerai); minors those below the age requirement (40 years of age for members of the chorus, for example); archons in office (at least for the trierarchy); and citizen soldiers (see Cleruchy) or invalids. In addition, citizens or resident aliens might be granted an honorary exemption, for services rendered to the city (ἀτέλεια / atéleia), but "not for trierarchy, nor contributions to the war " (proeisphora).

Those who were serving, or had previously served, as liturgists also had temporary exemptions. Thus, one could not be required to undertake two liturgies at once, or to take on the same civil liturgy two years in a row The liturgist of a religious holiday would not be held responsible for another liturgy in the following liturgical year. A trierarch was entitled to a respite of two years. Citizens serving in the Athenian cavalry were possibly exempt from the trierarchy.

These statutory exemptions allowed a rich Athenian to escape a liturgy, but they did not compel him to do so; a volunteer could undertake as many liturgies as he wished. Thus, an anonymous litigant defended by Lysias claimed to have been choragos three years running and trierarch for seven years. He listed several other liturgies performed during this period (suggesting that multiple liturgies could be undertaken simultaneously), which resulted in an expense of twelve talents, or more than a talent a year. However, it was rare for anyone to waive an exemption, and the anonymity of Lysias' client renders his claims dubious or exceptional to some historians.

==== Antidosis ====
The antidosis (Greek ἁντιδοσις, "exchange"), for which our main source is Demosthenes Against Phaenippus, was another loophole. This was a legal action filed by a newly appointed liturgist, against another citizen who he claimed was wealthier than himself and therefore more able to bear the financial burden. The defendant had the choice of accepting the liturgy, making an exchange of wealth or submitting to a trial. At trial, a jury decided which of the men was wealthier, and the one selected was responsible for the liturgy. When an antidosis action was filed pertaining to the trierarchy, the Athenians were concerned that the problem be resolved quickly, so the trial was required to take place within a month.

Given the strangeness of the concept, some historians have doubted the reality of the exchange of goods and suggested that the exchange was really a transfer of the liturgy itself. For contrary evidence, others look to Demosthenes' speech "Against Phaenippus", where an exchange of property is explicitly mentioned by the litigant: "For I made this offer before to Phaenippus, and now again, men of the jury, I tender it freely:—I will surrender to him all my property including the mines, if he will hand over to me the farm alone free from all encumbrances as it was when I first went to it with witnesses, and will replace as they were before the grain and wine and the other things which he has carried away from the buildings after removing the seals from the doors." However, it is possible that placing seals on the property was done solely to assess the respective fortunes of the owners.

The antidosis was apparently not uncommon, as evidenced by a joke by Ischomachus, the wealthy protagonist of Xenophon's Economics. When Socrates asked why he is known as a "good man" (καλὸς κἀγαθὸς / kagathos kalos), he replied: "In the event of an exchange (antidosis) of the responsibility of the trierarchy or the choragos, it is not the 'good man' that is called for!" However, while there are many known examples of antidosis proceedings (the speech for an antidosis lawsuit is part of the standard repertory of professional speech writers), there are no known cases of an exchange being effected.

==== Concealment ====
The easiest way to avoid the burden of the liturgy was to conceal one's wealth, which was very easy in Athens: information about property was fragmented, as there was no register of all the land belonging to an individual. Money and treasure were easily concealed from public view; the owner might choose to bury his wealth or place it with a banker ("trapezite"): thus the references to "invisible wealth" (ἀφανὴς οὐσια). The city demanded from each wealthy individual an estimate of his fortune (τίμημα) as part of the eisphora, but the resulting disclosures were not reliable. Metics in particular were known to undervalue their fortunes, since their wealth was all in liquid assets: they were not supposed to own land in Attica.

The concealment of assets by the wealthy appears to have been widespread, so that a client of Lysias boasts that his father would never resort to it: "when he might well have put his fortune away out of sight and refused to help you, he preferred that you should know of it, in order that, even if he chose to be a bad citizen, he could not, but must make the required contributions and perform the liturgies." According to Demosthenes, the rich hid their assets and did not reveal them to the public unless war threatened them or their holdings. The accusation of evasion of public charges was very common in judicial speeches: litigants clearly played upon the prejudices of the jury, that all the rich preferred not to pay, if they could get away with it.

== Success and limits of liturgies ==
=== Willing liturgists ===
Despite the financial burden posed by the Liturgies, their owners often performed them willingly. "It was an enterprise of which every citizen could be proud, and, if he was politically engaged, which allowed him to triumph over his audience, especially if he was the defendant in a political trial." ("C'était une entreprise dont tout citoyen aimait à s'enorgueillir et, s'il était politiquement engagé, dont il se prévalait devant son auditoire, surtout s'il était l'accusé d'un process politique.") The honorific inscriptions available show that, regularly, some wealthy citizens or resident aliens "had eagerly discharged them [their public services] all", by volunteering (ἐθελοντής), as Demosthenes had in 349 BC., for sometimes very expensive liturgies which they could escape. The liturgists can also be distinguished by hiring well above the minimum. Thus, in a speech of Lysias, the litigant lists the liturgies to which he submitted and states: "If I wanted to do the minimum the law required, I would not have even made a quarter of these expenditures".

This same litigant even adds a bit further on: "this is indeed how I treat the city: in my private life I'm thrifty, but in public office I gladly pay, and I am proud not of the property I have left, but of the spending that I made for you. " While making allowance for exaggeration intended to placate the jury, there is no reason to doubt the sincerity of this proclamation. This is a view shared by most of liturgists, a view reflecting the social position and prestige in proportion conferred by the financial effort made, as illustrated by the Lysias quote above.

The assumption of a liturgy is consistently an aristocratic prerogative and can be regarded as the "survival of noble morality" in the democratic city. Specifically, it established a tacit "contract" of mutually beneficial relationships between the city and its most affluent members, "while granting the rich an eminent place" ("tout en reconnaissant aux riches une place éminente,") bypassing "methods of individual patronage and placing the city, recipient of the benefit, in a position of authority" ("les formes de patronage individuel et place in fine la cité bénéficiaire en position d'autorité"). The high degree of discretion to liturgists in this case is decisive: the liturgist was assigned a task leaving him the freedom to determine how much to spend in order to achieve it. However the desire of the liturgist to conform to the ideal of a competitive elite was to the advantage of the city: no limit, upper or lower, is fixed, and "the competitive mentality inherited by the ancient aristocracy" ("la mentalité agonistique héritée de l'aristocratie archaïque)" was enough to ensure a certain rivalry between liturgists in dedication to the common good.

The liturgy was indeed an opportunity "with his wealth, simultaneously to affirm his devotion to the city, and to claim his place among the most important people" ("avec ses biens, à la fois d'affirmer son dévouement envers la cité et de revendiquer sa place parmi les gens qui comptent"), to better enforce the liturgist's political position and take his place - or to that to which he aspires - in the city: besides devoting his fortune to the public good, paying "his property and his person" the liturgist distinguishes himself from the vulgem pecus and gets the people of the city to confirm the legitimacy of his dominant social position, which would be especially significant when the liturgist was subsequently involved in a trial or election to the magistracy. Thus, liturgists, consisting of at most 10% of Athenian citizens in the 4th century BC., represent one third of politicians sufficiently significant to contemporary sources to mention them, they also correspond to one-third of the Athenians prominent enough in the Assembly to propose a decree. For its part, playing on the values of its elites, the democratic city controls them, gets their membership in a community project and ensures its own finance.

=== Challenges to a system of financing public life ===
==== The misthos ====
The discharge of liturgical responsibilities was originally considered mutually beneficial to the city and the aristocracy, but suffered its first challenge in the 5th century BC. when Pericles established the misthos. This was compensation awarded to citizens serving in certain public functions, to counterbalance the ties of patronage created by the magnificence with which Pericles' rival, Cimon, performed his liturgical responsibilities. This payment, to some extent anonymous, allowed the average Athenian citizen to perform public functions without becoming dependent on, or obligated to, the wealthiest.

==== Growing defiance to liturgical responsibilities ====
With the Peloponnesian War, increasing military expenditures began to undermine the liturgical system of public finance. The need for trierarchs was greater than ever, but the rich were increasingly trying to avoid the obligation. For the first time, the idea became current that personal wealth is not primarily intended to serve the city, but one's own good, even though expressed "discreetly, insensibly, without the rich admitting it openly". Thus, in 415 BC., the wealthy supporters of Nicias, opposed like him to the expedition to Sicily, preferred not to intervene, rather than risk the impression of worrying more about their own interests than those of the city. By 411 BC., the wealthy were less hesitant to defend their private interests, when they set up the oligarchy of the Four Hundred. In 405 BC, one of the characters in The Frogs remarks that "you can no longer find a rich man to be trierarch: each puts on rags and goes about whining 'I am needy!'"

The city emerged from the war impoverished and burdened by the debt incurred by the Thirty. Athens now needed the wealthy to carry out their liturgical obligations more than ever, but it had become rare for anyone to volunteer, especially for the trierarchy. A client of Lysias, for example, called service as trierarch "a dubious action". This exemplified the development of a certain defiance of liturgical responsibilities in the first half of the 4th century BC., a trend reinforced by the military and financial efforts agreed to at the time of the Corinthian War (395–386). The War Against the Allies (357–355), which was also very expensive, marked the end at mid-century of the dream of a return to the Athenian imperialism, which had been so lucrative. Therefore, the need for the Athenian state to find new sources of funding, could only be achieved through better management of public assets (the policy of Eubulus, then Lycurgus), and by increased financial pressure on the richest.

At each step, the city's urgent need for funding, transformed into an obligation, the previously voluntary demonstration of excellence (arété) by wealthy individuals. The complaints of the wealthy have an undeniable dimension of ideological and political hostility to the common people (demos): Xenophon and Isocrates emphasize that "the liturgy is a weapon in the hands of the poor". However, the less fortunate liturgists, those whose social status was closest to the average citizen, were quick to denounce the lack of civic-mindedness of the rich, who tended to be more supportive of the reactionary Oligarchy than of democracy. Theophrastus has one of his "Characters" intone: "When will they stop trying to ruin us with liturgies and the trierarchy?" Faced with the increasingly heavy financial requirements of the city, the wealthy were obliged to "choose between conserving their own wealth and conformity to elite values".

"Moreover, the symbolic nature of the liturgical function, without disappearing, faded away, in favor of its practical aspect". In fact, most of the complaints related to those liturgies perceived as lacking social value (proeisphora, syntriérarchie), or which involved direct financial contributions (such as the eisphora). Even though the financial burden they represented was less than the classical liturgies, they failed to allow the liturgist to assert his excellence.

==== Minimizing and avoiding expense ====
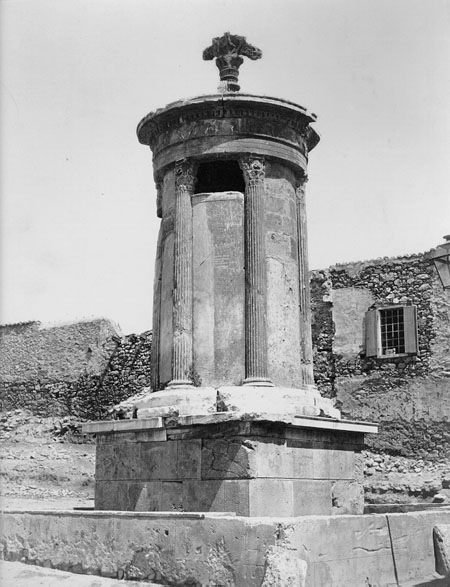
Choragic Monument of Lysicrates, 335/334 BC, commemorating his first prize

The wealthy adopted various strategies to control or avoid the expenses of liturgies. Attempts were made to increase the number of citizens or resident aliens eligible for liturgies. In 354, Demosthenes proposed to increase the number of trierarchs to 2000. Some trierarchs took their time to perform the function assigned to them, such as Polycles who neglected to take charge of a ship, forcing his predecessor, Apollodorus, to continue as trierarch for several months. Others chose to spend only the bare minimum: Isocrates explained how he performed his duty without waste or negligence and a client of Lysias told the jury that there was nothing wrong in showing restraint in spending. Some individuals brought lawsuits for the exchange of wealth (antidosis), despite the opportunity such actions offered their opponents to discredit them in a possible future trial. The most radical solution was to conceal one's wealth entirely.

The exact chronology of this phenomenon is problematic, however: the passage from adherence to liturgical responsibilities, to their rejection by the individuals obligated to perform them, is difficult to date precisely. Does the transition take place early in the 4th century BC., or in the second half of the century? Historians seem to have difficulty giving a definitive answer. Jacques Oulhen said:

The diverse documentation on this issue gives us some contradictory insights, which are not possible to reconcile. There are therefore numerous conflicting interpretations, and this remains one of the most technical and highly disputed issues in fourth century Athenian history ".

One thing is not disputed, however: the later one looks in the fourth century, the more fragile the social consensus regarding the liturgy becomes.

==== Luxury and concern ====
The liturgists' increasing desire for a rapid return on investment (which led to favorable treatment by the juries in trials in which they were involved), caused ordinary citizens to re-evaluate the utility of each liturgy. Lycurgus said in 330:

However, there are those among them who, giving up the attempt to convince you with arguments, seek your pardon by pleading their liturgies: Nothing makes me angrier, on this account, than the idea that expenses they sought for their own glory, should become a claim to public favor. No-one earns a right to your gratitude, simply for having fed the horses, or paid for lavish choregies, or other largesse of this kind; on such occasions, one obtains the crown of victory for himself alone, without the least benefit to others. But to perform the duties of a trierarchy with flair, or build walls to protect the city, or spend one's fortune for the city's well-being: those are actions for the public good, and in the interest of all. These are the gifts that reveal the dedication of a citizen; the others only prove the wealth of those who made them. However, I do not think anyone ever has performed services to the State great enough, to demand in return that traitors be permitted to avoid punishment.

One may differentiate the attack on certain liturgical expenditures (for example, the monument erected by Lysicrates as choregos in 335/334) of which the extravagant nature could simultaneously be "a superlative form of attachment to the liturgical ethic which was becoming a thing of the past.... and a danger to the ideal, and idealized, social equilibrium associated with the liturgies". Indeed, such ostentation indicated both the power of individual wealth and the powerlessness of the city. As a result, to avoid breaking the bonds between social groups, the desire of the richest to show off their wealth (itself the cause of social tension) was channeled into the transformation of the liturgies into a system of public philanthropy.
