= 368 BC =

368 BC in various calendars
| Gregorian calendar | 368 BC; CCCLXVIII BC |
| Ab urbe condita | 386 |
| Ancient Egypt era | XXX dynasty, 13 |
| Pharaoh | Nectanebo I, 13 |
| Ancient Greek Olympiad (summer) | 103rd Olympiad (victor)¹ |
| Assyrian calendar | 4383 |
| Balinese saka calendar | N/A |
| Bengali calendar | −961 – −960 |
| Berber calendar | 583 |
| Buddhist calendar | 177 |
| Burmese calendar | −1005 |
| Byzantine calendar | 5141–5142 |
| Chinese calendar | 壬子年 (Water Rat); 2330 or 2123 — to — 癸丑年 (Water Ox); 2331 or 2124 |
| Coptic calendar | −651 – −650 |
| Discordian calendar | 799 |
| Ethiopian calendar | −375 – −374 |
| Hebrew calendar | 3393–3394 |
- Hindu calendars
| Vikram Samvat | −311 – −310 |
| Shaka Samvat | N/A |
| Kali Yuga | 2733–2734 |
| Holocene calendar | 9633 |
| Iranian calendar | 989 BP – 988 BP |
| Islamic calendar | 1019 BH – 1018 BH |
| Javanese calendar | N/A |
| Julian calendar | N/A |
| Korean calendar | 1966 |
| Minguo calendar | 2279 before ROC 民前2279年 |
| Nanakshahi calendar | −1835 |
| Thai solar calendar | 175–176 |
| Tibetan calendar | 阳水鼠年 (male Water-Rat) −241 or −622 or −1394 — to — 阴水牛年 (female Water-Ox) −240 or −621 or −1393 |

Year 368 BC was a year of the pre-Julian Roman calendar. At the time, it was known as the Year of the Tribunate of Cornelius, Praetextatus, Structus, Capitolinus, Crassus and Cicurinus (or, less frequently, year 386 Ab urbe condita). The denomination 368 BC for this year has been used since the early medieval period, when the Anno Domini calendar era became the prevalent method in Europe for naming years.

== Events ==
=== By place ===
==== Greece ====
- While the previous year's intervention by the Macedonians in Thessaly is successful, after the Macedonian troops withdraw, Alexander of Pherae treats his subjects as cruelly as before. So the Thessalians seek Thebes' support. Pelopidas is sent to their assistance, but is treacherously seized and imprisoned.
- In response, Epaminondas is reinstated in command of Theban troops and leads the Theban army into Thessaly, where he outmanoeuvres the Thessalians and secures the release of Pelopidas without a fight.
- At the instigation of Alexander's brother-in-law, Ptolemy of Aloros, Alexander II of Macedon is assassinated during a festival. Although Alexander's brother, Perdiccas III becomes the next king, he is under age, and Ptolemy is appointed regent.

==== China ====
- Zhou Xian Wang becomes king of the Zhou dynasty of China.

=== By topic ===
==== Philosophy ====
- Plato's Republic is completed. It lays down the rules for an ideal, righteous society and suggests that kings ought to be philosophers (or at least taught by philosophers).

== Deaths ==
- Alexander II, King of Macedonia (assassinated)
