= 3rd century BC =

One hundred years, from 300 BC to 201 BC

Hannibal crosses the Alps during the Second Punic War

The 3rd century BC started the first day of 300 BC and ended the last day of 201 BC. It is considered part of the Classical Era, epoch, or historical period.

In the Mediterranean Basin, the first few decades of this century were characterized by a balance of power between the Greek Hellenistic kingdoms in the east, and the great mercantile power of Carthage in the west. This balance was shattered when conflict arose between ancient Carthage and the Roman Republic. In the following decades, the Carthaginian Republic was first humbled and then destroyed by the Romans in the First and Second Punic Wars. Following the Second Punic War, Rome became the most important power in the western Mediterranean.

In the eastern Mediterranean, the Seleucid Empire and Ptolemaic Kingdom, successor states to the empire of Alexander the Great, fought a series of Syrian Wars for control over the Levant. In mainland Greece, the short-lived Antipatrid dynasty of Macedon was overthrown and replaced by the Antigonid dynasty in 294 BC, a royal house that would dominate the affairs of Hellenistic Greece for roughly a century until the stalemate of the First Macedonian War against Rome. Macedon would also lose the Cretan War against the Greek city-state of Rhodes and its allies.

In India, Ashoka ruled the Maurya Empire. The Pandya, Chola and Chera dynasties of the classical age flourished in the ancient Tamil country.

The Warring States period in China drew to a close, with Qin Shi Huang conquering the six other nation-states and establishing the short-lived Qin dynasty, the first empire of China, which was followed in the same century by the long-lasting Han dynasty. However, a brief interregnum and civil war existed between the Qin and Han periods known as the Chu-Han contention, lasting until 202 BC with the ultimate victory of Liu Bang over Xiang Yu.

The Protohistoric Period began in Korea. In the following century the Chinese Han dynasty would conquer the Gojoseon kingdom of northern Korea. The Xiongnu were at the height of their power in Mongolia. They defeated the Han Chinese at the Battle of Baideng in 200 BC, marking the beginning of the forced Heqin tributary agreement and marriage alliance that would last several decades.

== The world in the 3rd century BC ==
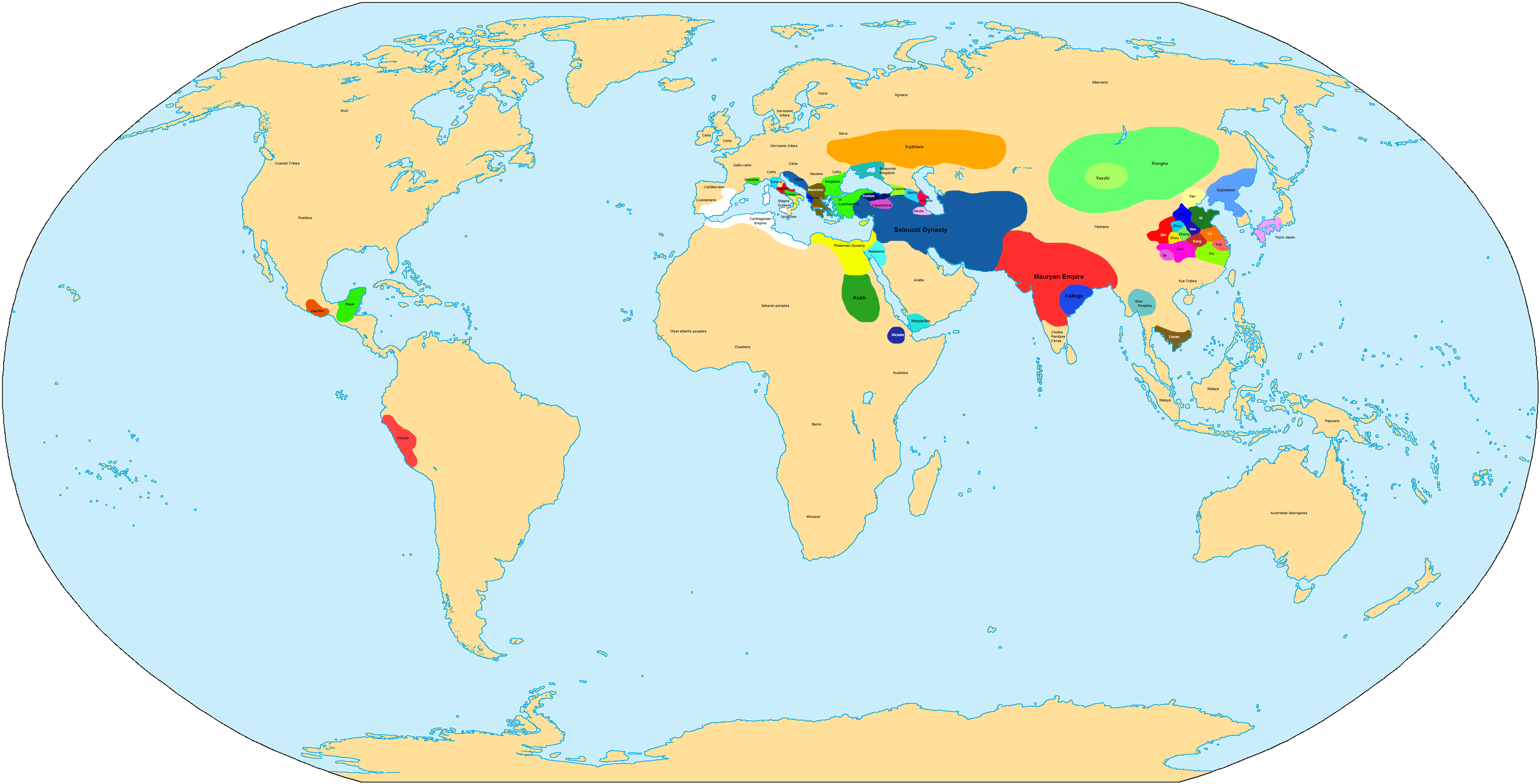
Map of the world in 300 BC, the beginning of the third century BC.

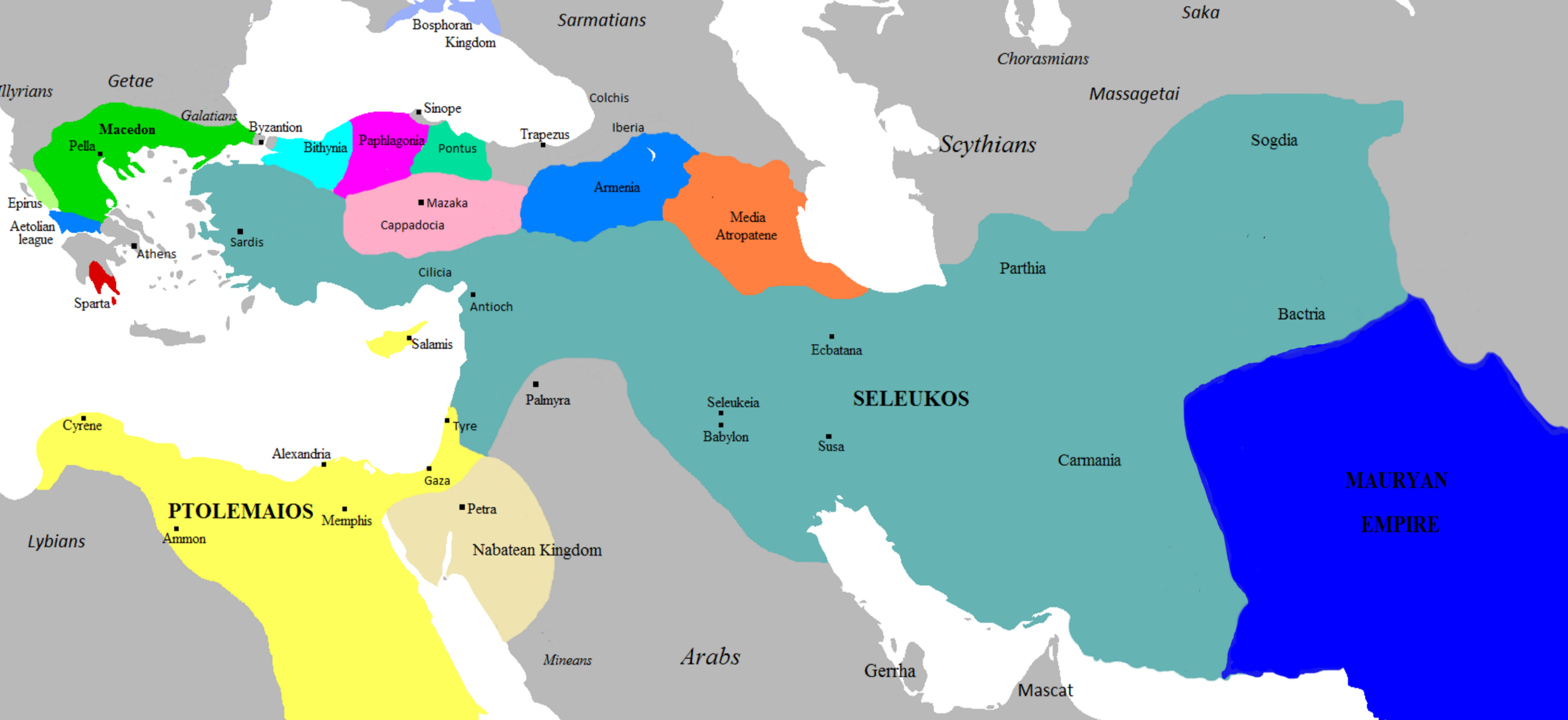
Map of the Hellenistic world and Maurya Empire in 281 BC.

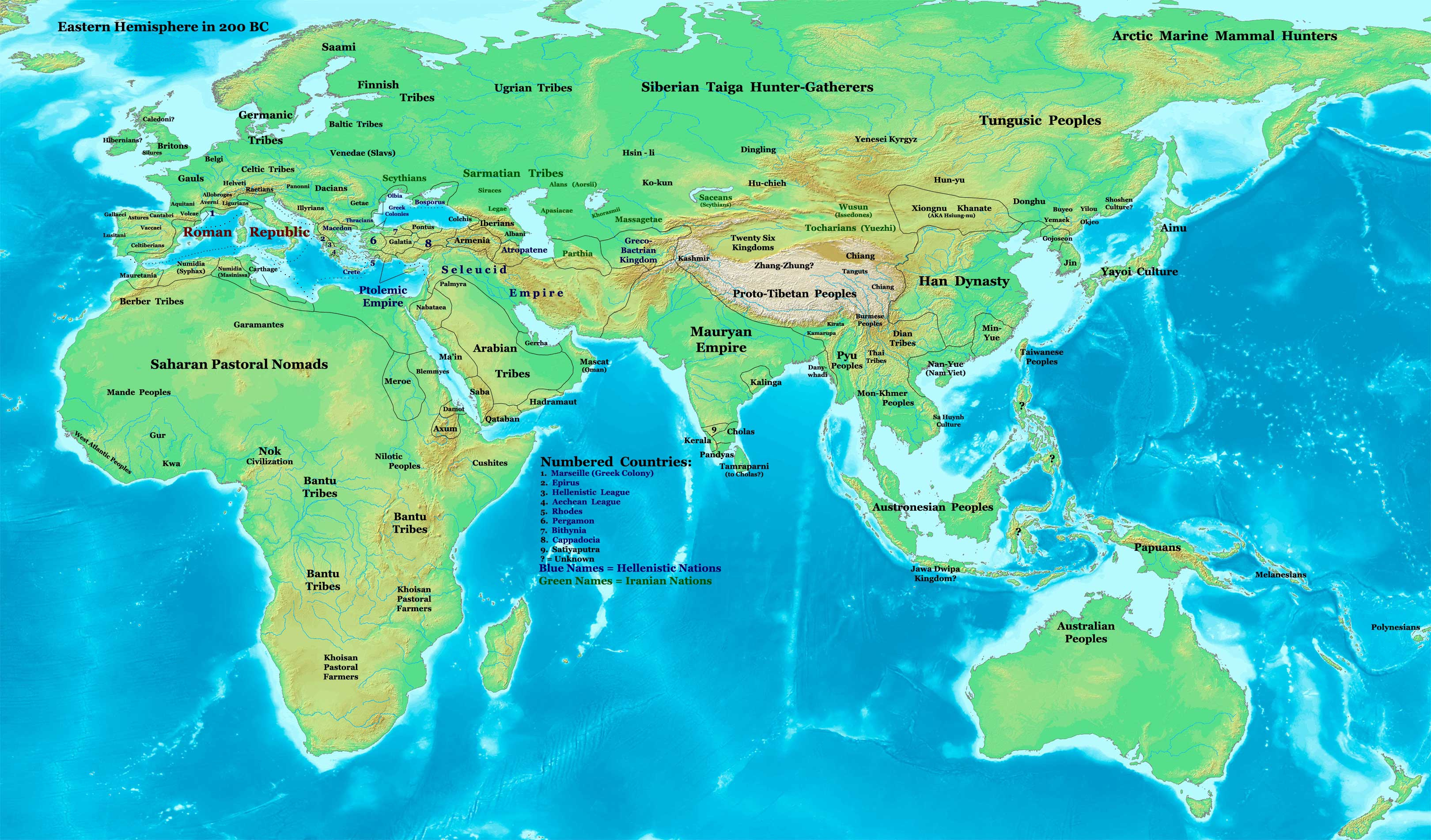
Map of the world in 200 BC, the end of the third century BC.

== Events ==
=== 290s BC ===
- 299 BC: The Samnites, seizing their chance when Rome is engaged on the Lombard plain, start the Third Samnite War with a collection of mercenaries from Gaul and Sabine and Etruscan allies to help them.
- 298 BC: The Samnites defeat the Romans under Lucius Cornelius Scipio Barbatus in the Battle of Camerinum, the first battle of the Third Samnite War.
- 294 BC: Antipater II of Macedon is killed by Lysimachus, allowing Demetrius I to become king of Macedonia, thus ending the Antipatrid dynasty's control over Hellenistic Greece and ushering in a period of rule by the Antigonid dynasty.
- 293 BC: The Chinese State of Qin reduced the threat of the State of Wei and the State of Han with the Qin victory in the Battle of Yique.
- Roman armies penetrate into the heart of the Samnite territory and then capture the Samnite cities of Taurasia, Bovianum Vetus and Aufidena.
- Agathocles, king of Syracuse, Sicily, assists the Italian Greeks against the Bruttians.
- Bindusara succeeds his father Chandragupta Maurya as emperor of the Mauryan Empire.
- The Epi-Olmec culture forms as a successor civilization to the Olmecs in Mesoamerica.

=== 280s BC ===
- 285 BC: The Pharos of Alexandria is completed.
- 281 BC: Antiochus I Soter, on the assassination of his father Seleucus becomes emperor of the Seleucid Empire.
- 281 BC: Achaean League founded in Greece.
- 280 BC: King Pyrrhus of Epirus invades Italy in an attempt to subjugate the Romans and bring Italy under a new empire ruled by himself.
- 280 BC: Construction of the Colossus of Rhodes is completed.

=== 270s BC ===
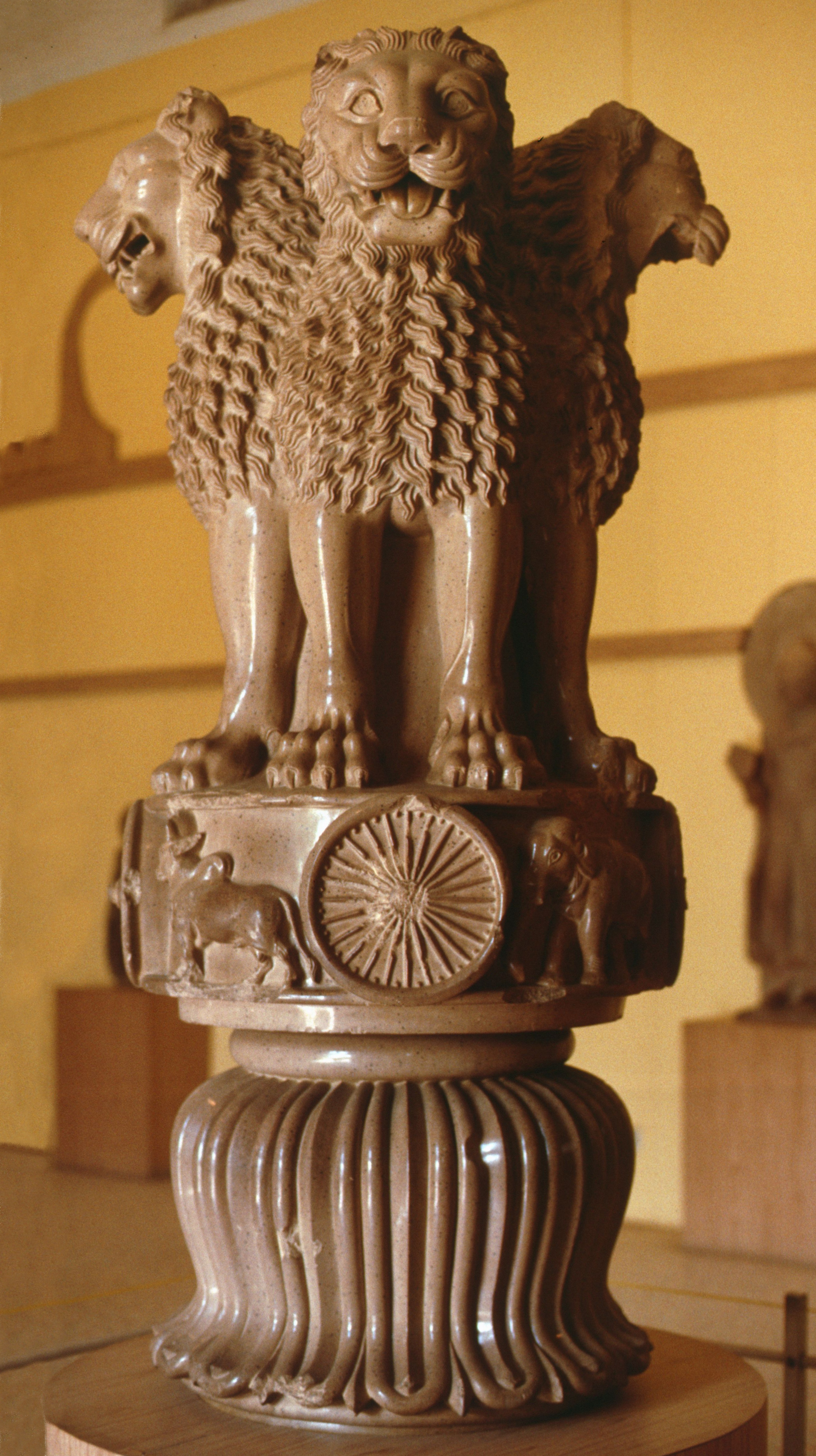
The Lion Capital of Ashoka of Sarnath, Uttar Pradesh, India, now the National Emblem of India, 3rd century BC, dated to the reign of Ashoka the Great during the Maurya Empire

- 279 BC: Singidunum and Taurunum, today's Belgrade and Zemun, are founded by Scordisci Celts.
- After failing to decisively defeat the Romans, Pyrrhus of Epirus withdraws from Italy.
- Gallic migration to Macedon, Thrace and Galatia. During the Gallic invasion of Greece, the Macedonian king Ptolemy Keraunos is killed in battle by the forces of the Celtic ruler Bolgios. However, both he and Brennus are driven out of Macedonian territory by Sosthenes of Macedon.
- 277 BC: in the Battle of Lysimachia, the invasion by Gauls is finally defeated by Antigonus II of Macedon.
- 274 BC: the First Syrian War erupts between Antiochus I Soter of the Seleucid dynasty and Ptolemy II Philadelphus of the Ptolemaic dynasty over control of Syria and southern Anatolia.
- 273 BC – 232 BC: Ashoka the Great ruled the Maurya Empire.

=== 260s BC ===
- 265 BC: Kalinga War takes place between Ashoka the Great and the kingdom of Kalinga.
- 264 BC: First Punic War breaks out between the Carthaginian Empire and the Roman Republic.
- 261 BC: Antiochus II Theos, 2nd son, at the death of his father becomes emperor of the Seleucid Empire.
- 260 BC: Battle of Changping between the State of Qin and the State of Zhao in China; a decisive Qin victory.
- 260 BC: Ashoka inscribes the Edicts of Ashoka.

=== 250s BC ===
- 258 BC: An Dương Vương overthrows the Hồng Bàng dynasty in Viet Nam.
- 257 BC: Thục dynasty takes over Vietnam.

=== 240s BC ===
- 246 BC: The death of Antiochus II sparks the Third Syrian War; Ptolemy III conquers Syria and Babylon from the Seleucids, but loses the Nesiotic League to Antigonus II
- 246 BC: Sporadic riots and military conflicts in Egypt between the Egyptian people and the government.
- 243 BC: Surprise attack on the Macedonian garrison at Corinth. Expansion of the Achaean League.
- 241 BC: First Punic War ends in Carthaginian defeat. Rome demands large reparations, and annexes Sicily and Corsica.
- 240 BC: On May 15, Chinese mathematicians observed and recorded the passage of the Halley's Comet.

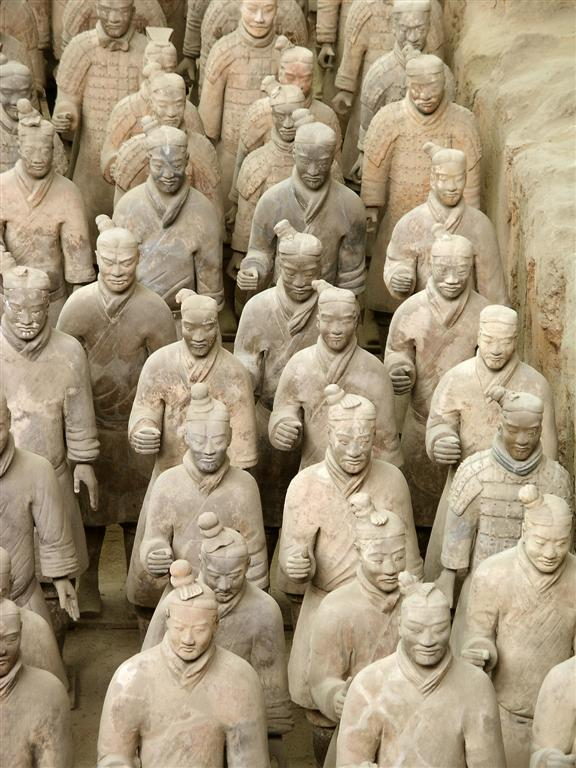
The Chinese Terracotta Army of Qin Shi Huang's tomb at Xi'an, Shaanxi, China

=== 230s BC ===
- 230 BC: The Chinese Qin State conquers Han.
- 230 BC: Simuka declares independence from Mauryan rule and establishes the Satavahana Empire.

=== 220s BC ===
- 229 BC: The First Illyrian War ends with a Roman victory.
- 229 BC: Last tyrants on the Peloponnese abdicate, Argos joins the Achaean League, Athens liberated from Macedonian garrison.
- 227 BC: The attempted assassination of Ying Zheng (嬴政), king of Qin State, by Jing Ke (荊軻) from Yan failed.
- 225 BC: A large Gallic army is defeated by the Romans at the Battle of Telamon.
- 225 BC: The Chinese Qin State conquers Wei.
- 223 BC: The Chinese Qin State conquers Chu.
- 222 BC: The Chinese Qin State conquers Yan and Zhao.
- 222 BC: Spartan defeat in the Battle of Sellasia ends the Cleomenean War.
- 221 BC: With the conquest of the State of Qi, Qin Shi Huang (秦始皇) unifies the whole of China into one empire that also included northern Vietnam, forming the Qin dynasty.
- 220 BC: the Social War (220–217 BC) of Greece begins, pitting Macedonia and the Achaean League against Sparta and the Aetolian League, ultimately resulting in a Macedonian-Achaean victory with territorial gains for each.

=== 210s BC ===
- 218 BC: Second Punic War begins. Hannibal makes his famous Alpine crossing to invade Italy, the Roman heartland.
- 217 BC: Antiochus III invades the Levant in the Third Syrian War, but is defeated by Ptolemy IV at the Battle of Raphia.
- 216 BC: Hannibal famously crushed the Roman legions at the Battle of Cannae.
- 214 BC: Qin Shi Huang (秦始皇) of the Chinese Qin dynasty ordered construction of the Great Wall of China.
- 214 BC: In the Mediterranean, the First Macedonian War between Rome and Macedon begins, with Rome encouraging its Greek allies, such as Attalus I of Pergamon, to attack the forces of Philip V of Macedon.
- 210 BC: Qin Shi Huang dies while on a trip to the far eastern reaches of his empire in an attempt to procure an elixir of immortality from Taoist magicians.

=== 200s BC ===
- 208 BC: Zhao Tuo (Triệu Đà) defeats the Vietnamese king An Dương Vương.
- 207 BC: Triệu dynasty of Viet Nam is inaugurated.
- 206 BC: Qin dynasty falls after men from all over China revolts, attacking officials, raising armies, and declaring themselves kings of seized territories.
- 206 BC – 186 BC: The Great Theban Revolt: Egyptians rise in revolt against Ptolemaic rulers, Horwennefer proclaimed pharaoh over Upper Egypt.
- 206 BC – 202 BC: Civil war of the Chu-Han contention in China.
- 205 BC: the Cretan War (205–200 BC) begins between Macedonia and its allies against the Greek polis of Rhodes and its allies, resulting in a Rhodian victory.
- 202 BC: Romans defeat Carthage, ending the Second Punic War. Carthage's territories are reduced to some of its North African holdings, and crippling reparations are demanded by Rome.
- 202 BC: In East Asia, the Chu-Han contention comes to a close, Xiang Yu commits suicide, and the Han dynasty of China is founded (202 BC–220 AD) by Liu Bang.
- 200 BC: The Second Macedonian War between Rome and Macedon begins.
- Indian traders regularly visit Arabia.
- Scythians occupy Sogdiana, in modern-day Uzbekistan.

== Inventions, discoveries, introductions ==
- Eratosthenes accurately calculates Earth's circumference and introduces the sieve of Eratosthenes, an algorithm for identifying prime numbers.
- Weiqi, known as Go in English, well-established in China, and may date back to the 2nd millennium BC.
- Crucible steel was first produced in Southern India.
- Canopus stele of Ptolemy III implements the leap year in Egypt. Leap year not formally recognized until Caesar in 55 BC.
- First Roman sundial (293 BC).
- Toe stirrup finds its earliest manifestation in India.
- Water screw invented by Archimedes.
- The Euclidean algorithm, the oldest algorithm still in use today, introduced by Euclid.
- Invention of the hydraulis (the precursor to the Pipe organ) by Ctesibius, a Greek engineer working in Alexandria.
- Zinc mining was first smelted from zinc ore in India
- Emperor Gaozu of Han China discovers an elaborate mechanical puppet theater in the treasury of the previous ruler Qin Shi Huang.
- The enormous Du Jiang Yan Irrigation System of China is engineered and constructed by Li Bing (李冰) in 256 BC.
- Great Stupa, Sanchi, Madhya Pradesh, India, Maurya period, is founded by King Chandragupta Maurya.
- Silk is exported to Europe from China.
- Armillary spheres, models of objects in the sky developed by the Greeks, are in use as teaching tools.
- Rotary mill invented by the ancient Greeks.

== Significant people ==
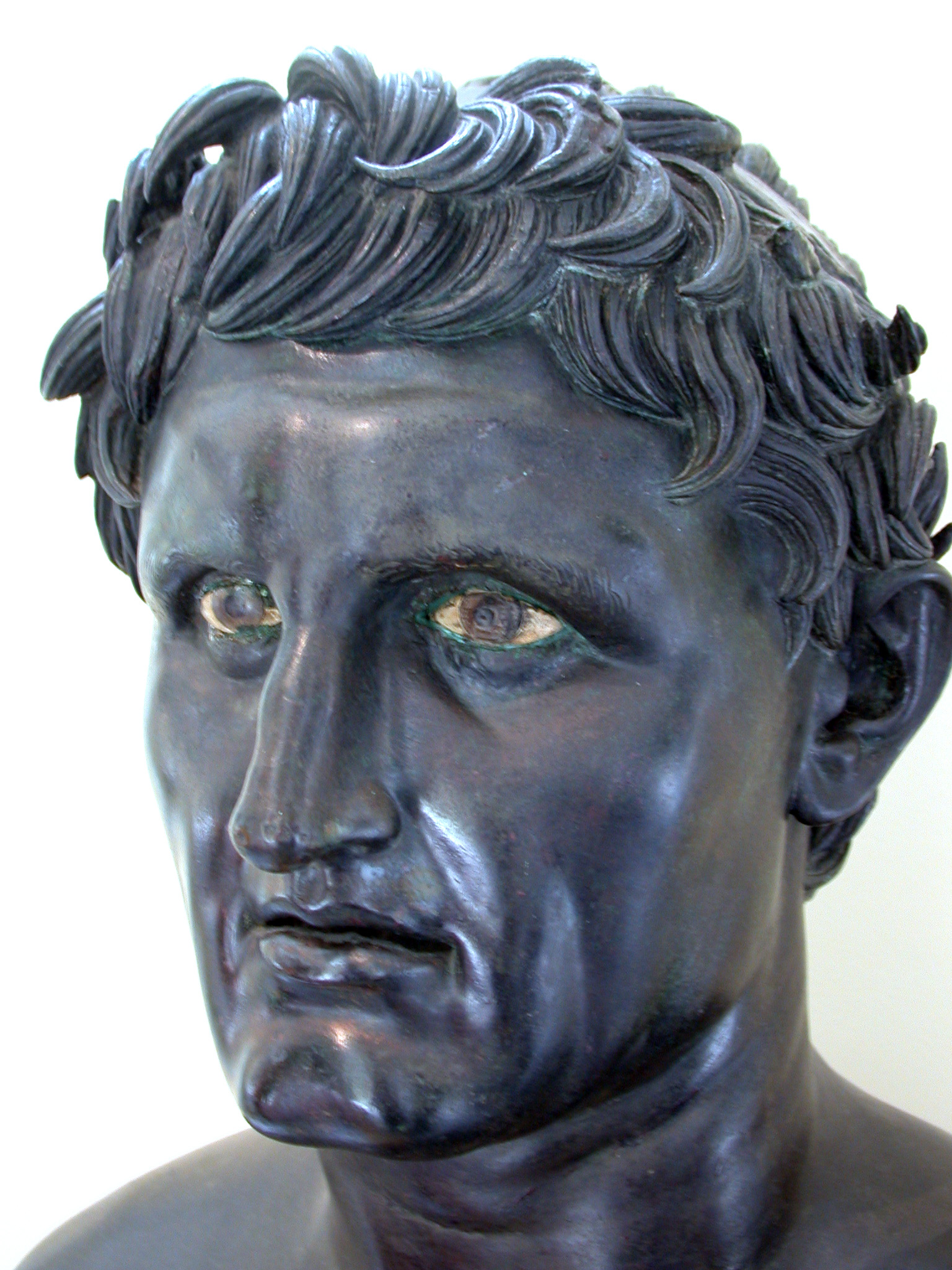
Seleucus I

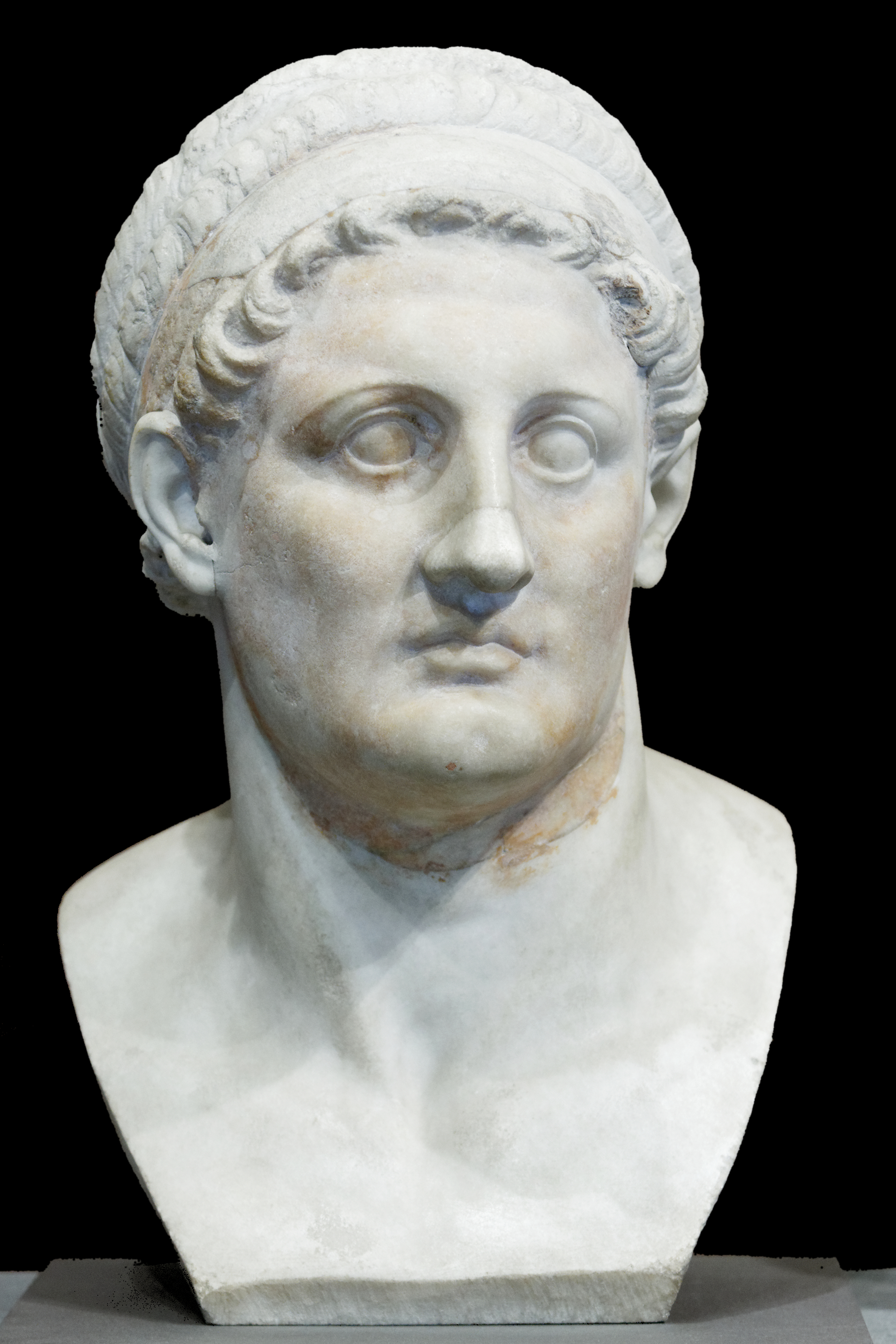
Ptolemy Soter

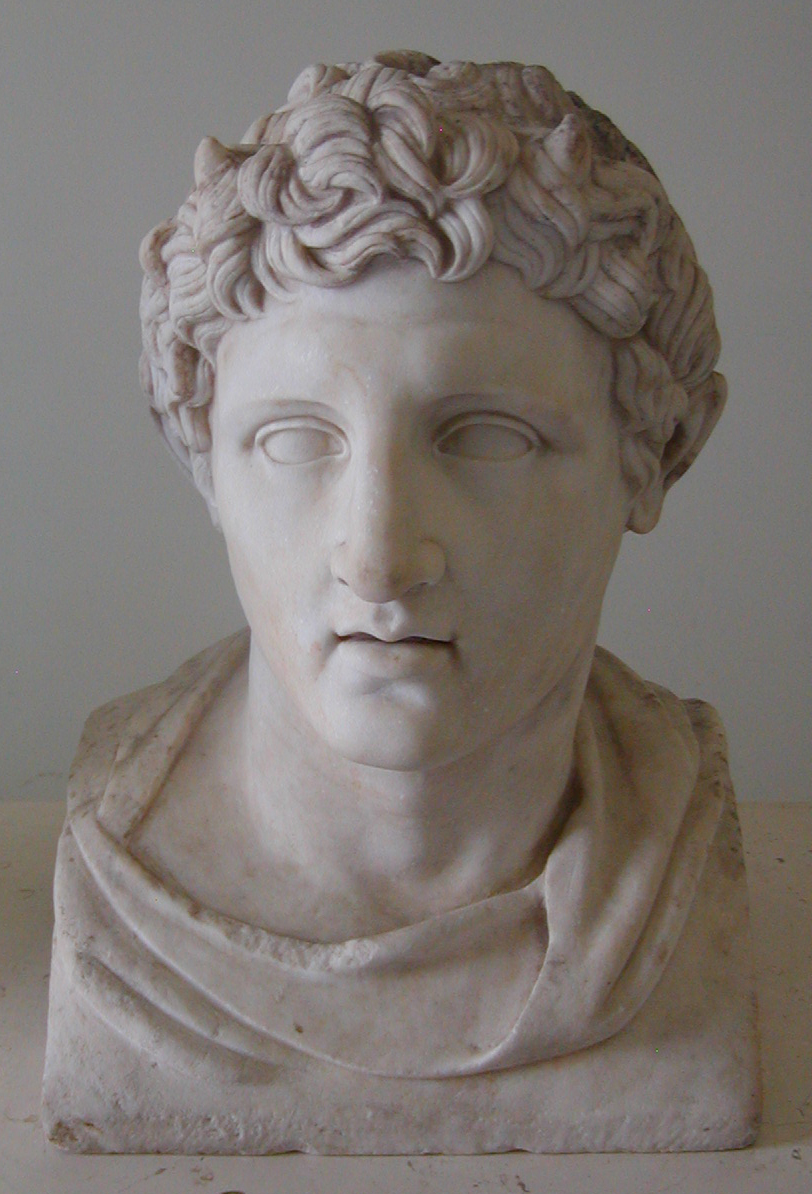
Demetrius Poliorcetes

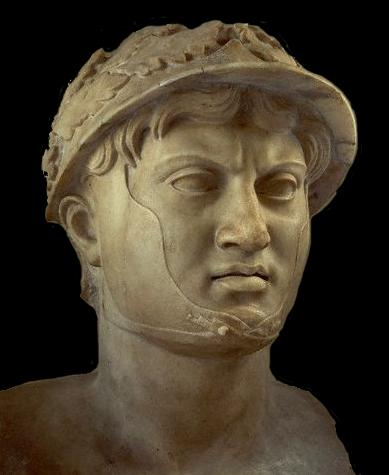
Pyrrhus of Epirus

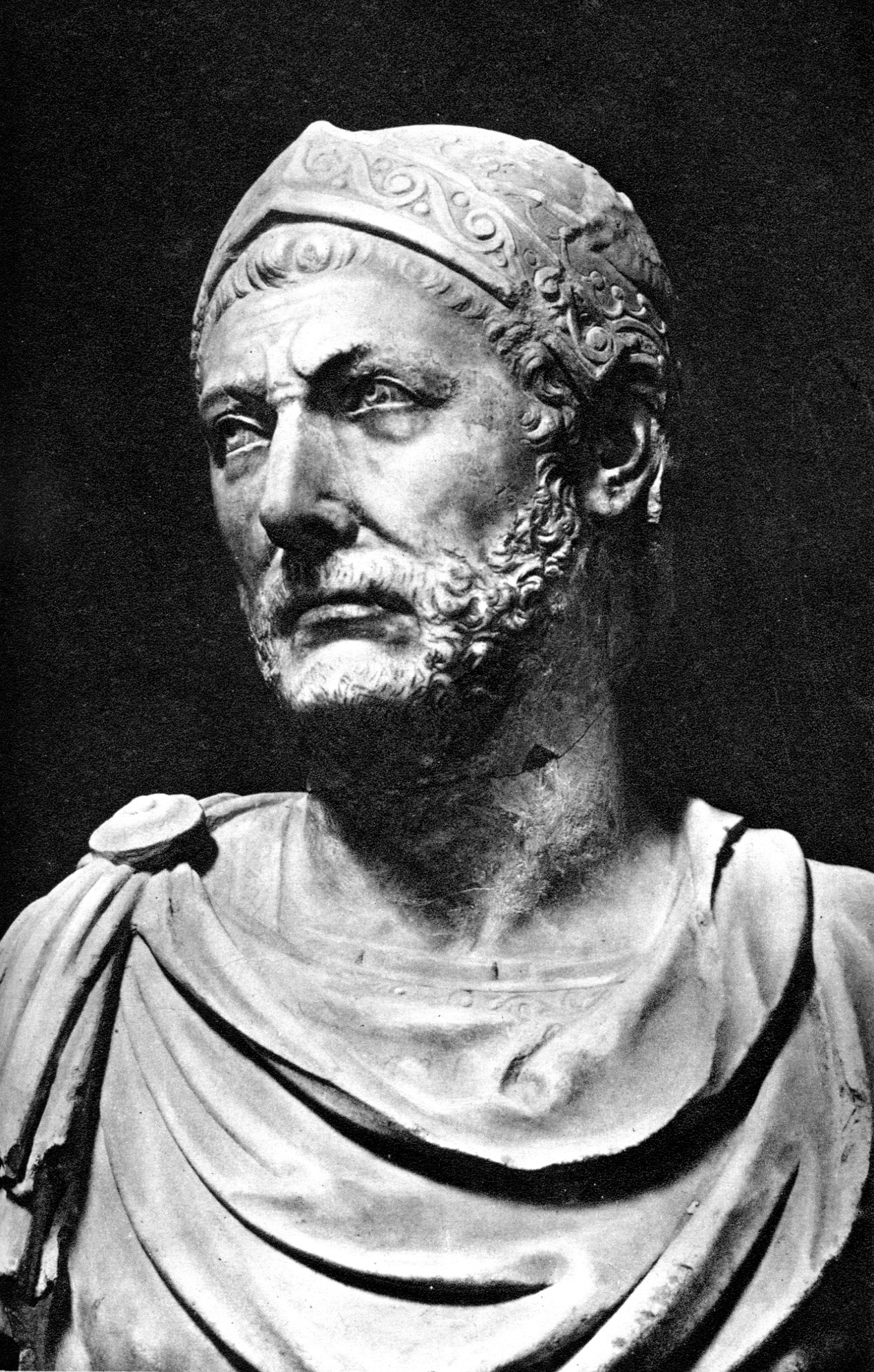
Hannibal

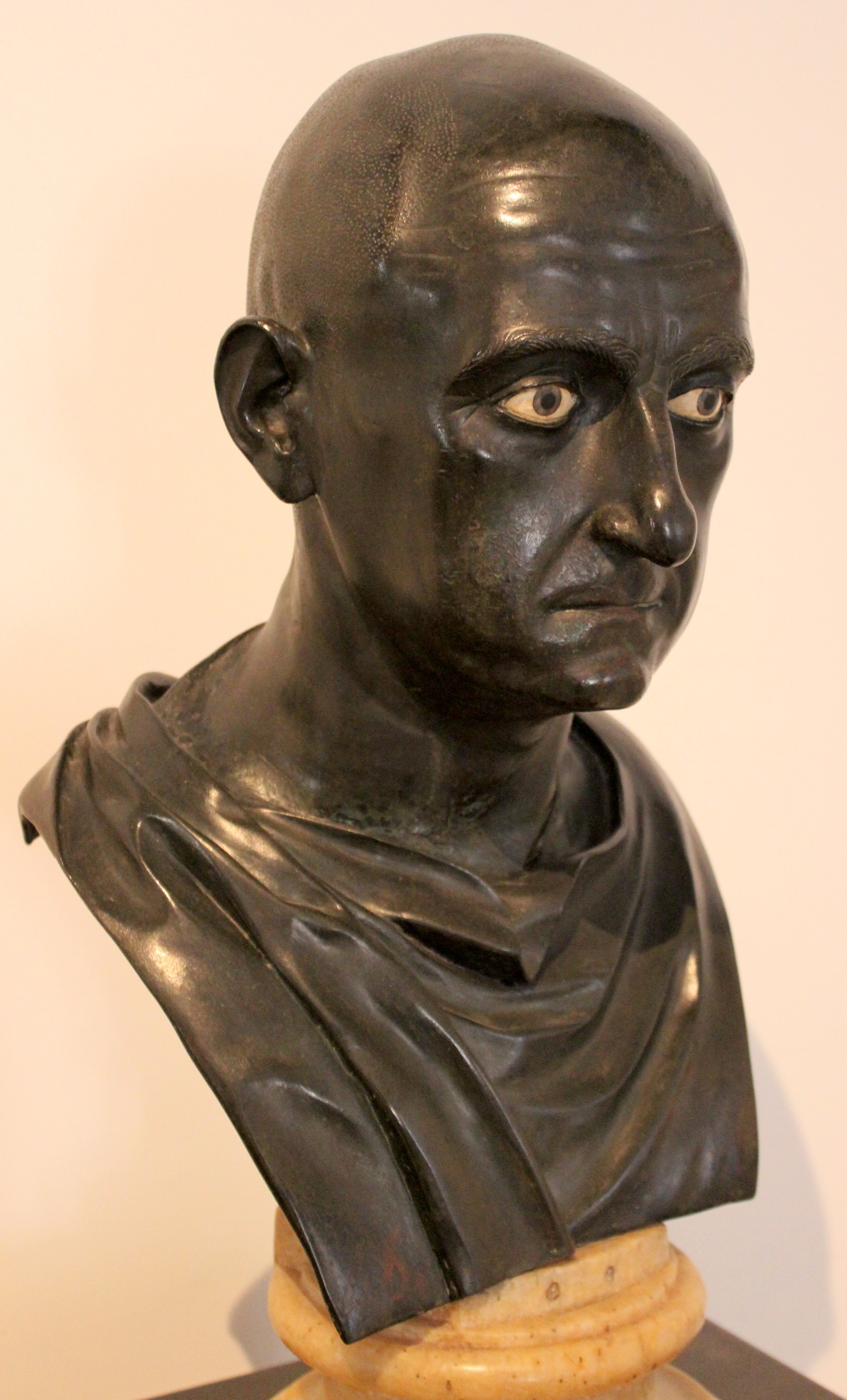
Scipio Africanus

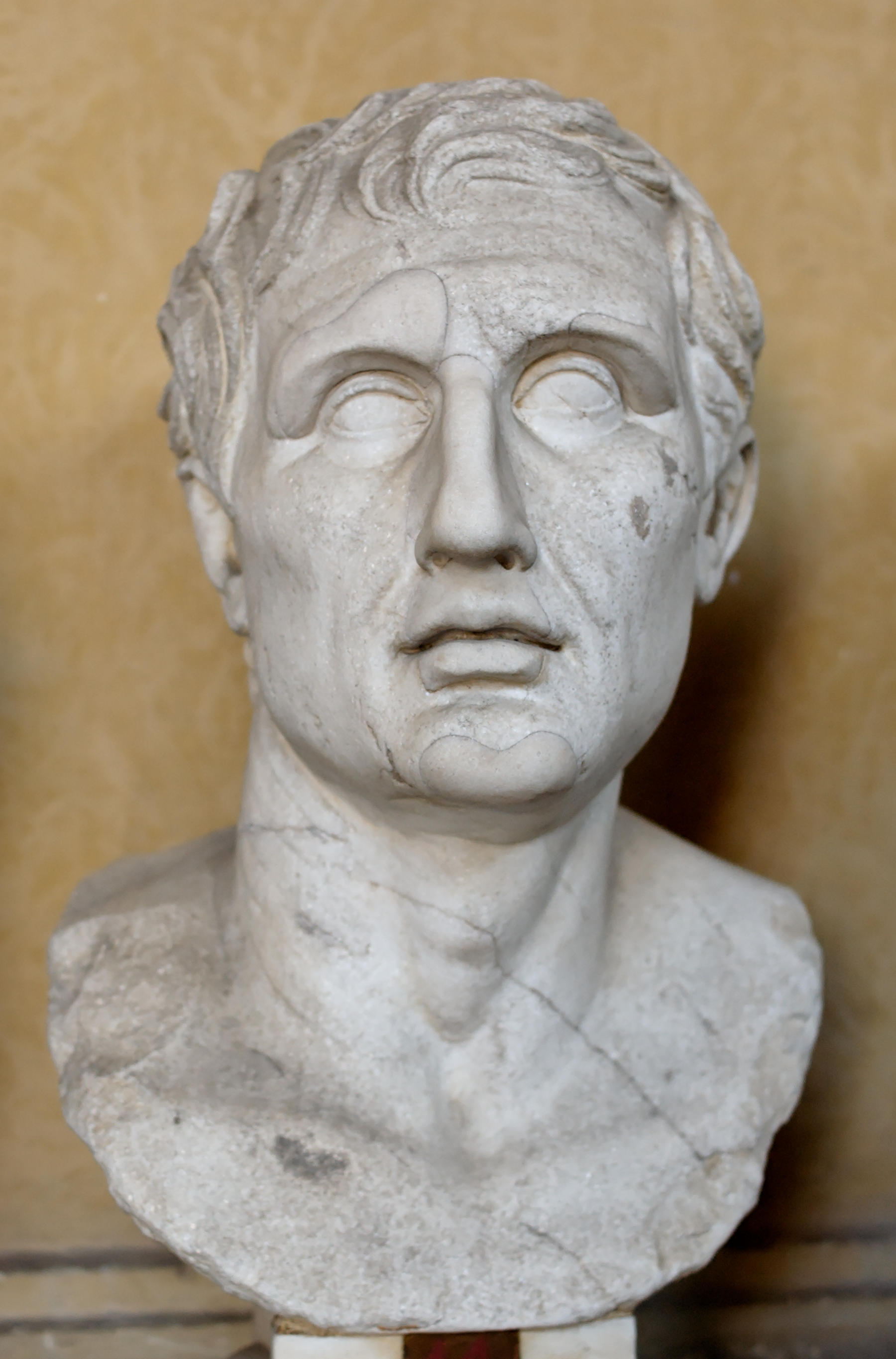
Menander

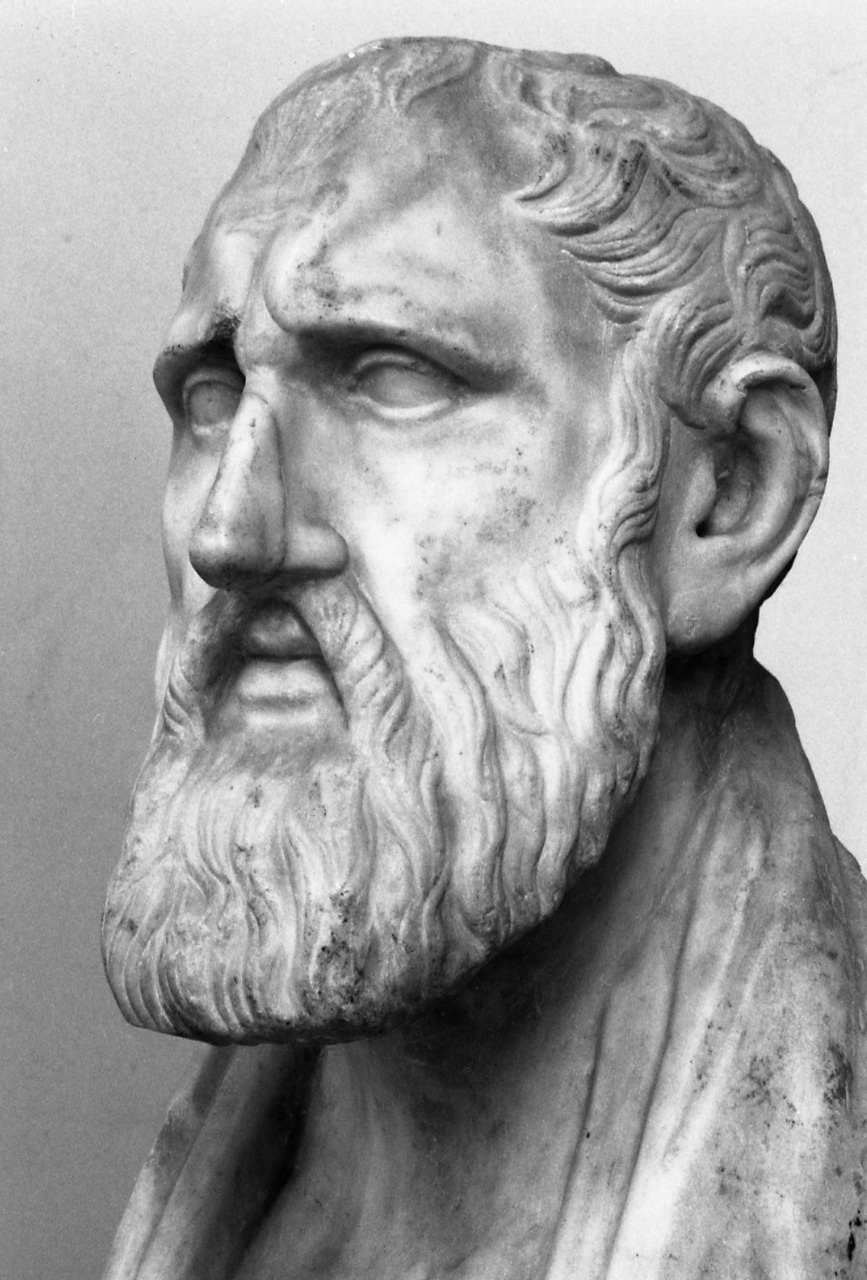
Zeno of Citium

=== Politics ===
- Appius Claudius Caecus, Roman statesman
- Aratus of Sicyon, Greek statesman
- Arsinoe II, co-ruler of Egypt
- Ashoka, Mauryan ruler of India
- Bindusara, ruler of the Mauryan Empire
- Diodotus I, first ruler of Greco-Bactrian Kingdom
- Emperor Gaozu of Han (高皇帝), founder of the Han dynasty in China
- Hamilcar Barca, Carthaginian general and politician
- Hannibal, Carthaginian general and politician
- Hanno the Great, Carthaginian politician
- Horwennefer, Egyptian pharaoh
- Ilamchetchenni, king of the Chola dynasty in South India
- Nedunjeliyan I, ruler of the Pandya dynasty in South India
- King Zhaoxiang of Qin, Chinese king of the Qin state
- Li Bing (李冰), Chinese administrator and engineer
- Li Si (李斯), Chinese Chancellor of the Qin dynasty
- Lü Buwei, Chinese merchant and Chancellor of Qin
- Lin Xiangru, Chinese politician
- Marcus Porcius Cato, Roman statesman and writer
- Masinissa, king of Numidia
- Modu Chanyu, Xiongnu chieftain
- Philip V of Macedon, King of Macedonia
- Ptolemy I, pharaoh of Egypt
- Ptolemy II, pharaoh of Egypt
- Publius Cornelius Scipio Africanus, Roman general and politician
- Pyrrhus of Epirus, King of Epirus
- Qin Shi Huang (秦始皇), Chinese Emperor
- Quintus Fabius Maximus Verrucosus, Roman general and politician
- Xiao He, Chinese statesman and Chancellor of the Han dynasty
- Zhang Liang, Chinese strategist and statesman

=== Military ===
- Bai Qi (白起), Chinese general
- Gaius Lutatius Catulus, Roman general
- Han Xin, Chinese general
- Hasdrubal Barca, Carthaginian general
- Lian Po, Chinese general
- Li Mu, Chinese general
- Mago Barca, Carthaginian general
- Manius Curius Dentatus, Roman general
- Marcus Atilius Regulus, Roman general
- Marcus Claudius Marcellus, Roman general
- Meng Tian, Chinese general
- Xanthippus of Carthage, Greek general
- Wang Jian, Chinese general
- Xiang Yu (項羽), Chinese rebel general against the Qin dynasty
- Zhao Tuo, Chinese military commander who conquered the Vietnamese Kingdom of Au Lac

=== Literature ===
- Apollonius of Rhodes, Greek poet
- Aratus, Greek poet
- Callimachus, Greek poet and scholar
- Gnaeus Naevius, Roman poet
- Herodas, Greek satirist
- Menander, Greek playwright
- Menippus, Greek satirist
- Plautus, Old Latin playwright
- Song Yu (宋玉), Chinese poet
- Theocritus, Greek poet
- Timaeus, Greek Historian
- Qu Yuan (屈原), Chinese poet and scholar
- Sangam literature (300BC-100AD), of the Tamil language

=== Science and philosophy ===
- Apollonius of Perga, Greek mathematician
- Arcesilaus, Greek philosopher
- Archimedes, Greek mathematician, physicist, and engineer
- Aristarchus of Samos, Greek astronomer and mathematician
- Aristillus, the Greek astronomer
- Berossus Hellenistic Babylonian historian and astronomer
- Conon of Samos, the Greek astronomer
- Demetrius of Phalerum, Greek philosopher and orator
- Dicaearchus, Greek philosopher and scientist
- Epicurus, Greek philosopher
- Eratosthenes, Greek mathematician, geographer, and astronomer
- Euclid, the Greek geometer
- Han Fei (韓非), Chinese philosopher
- Manetho, Hellenistic Egyptian historian
- Mencius, Chinese philosopher
- Philo of Byzantium, Greek mechanic
- Pyrrho, Greek philosopher
- Theophrastus, Greek philosopher
- Timon of Phlius, Greek philosopher
- Xun Kuang (荀況, Xun Li), Chinese philosopher
- Zeno of Citium, Greek philosopher
- Zenodotus, Greek grammarian

== Sovereign states ==
See: List of sovereign states in the 3rd century BC.
