= 210s BC =

Decade

This article concerns the period 219 BC – 210 BC.

== Births ==
217 BC

- Xin Zhui, a Han dynasty noblewoman

216 BC

- Liu Pi, Chinese prince and general of the Han Dynasty (d. 154 BC)

215 BC

- Antiochus IV Epiphanes, king of the Seleucid Empire (d. 164 BC) (approximate date)

210 BC

- Hui, emperor of the Han dynasty (d. 188 BC)
- Ptolemy V Epiphanes, king of Egypt (d. 180 BC)
- Zhang Yan, Chinese empress of the Han dynasty (d. 163 BC)

== Deaths ==
219 BC

- Cleomenes III, Spartan king from 235 BC to 222 BC, who reorganized Sparta's political structure and struggled unsuccessfully to destroy the Achaean League.

217 BC

- Arsaces I, King of Parthia
- Gaius Flaminius, Roman consul and general
- Pinnes (also Pinneus or Pineus), son of Agron, king of Illyria, and Agron's first wife Triteuta

216 BC

- August 2
  - Lucius Aemilius Paullus, Roman consul and general (killed in the Battle of Cannae)
  - Gnaeus Servilius Geminus, Roman consul 217 BC (killed in the Battle of Cannae)
  - Marcus Minucius Rufus, Roman consul 221 BC, Master of the Horse 217 BC (killed in the Battle of Cannae)
- Gelo, son of Hiero II
- Marcus Aemilius Lepidus, Roman consul 232 BC and priest (augur)

215 BC

- Apollonius of Rhodes, Greek author (b. 295 BC)
- Hiero II, tyrant of Syracuse from 270 BC (b. c. 308 BC)
- Hieronymus, grandson of Hiero II of Syracuse and tyrant (assassinated) (b. c. 231 BC)
- Emperor Kōrei of Japan, according to legend.

214 BC

- Demetrius of Pharos, Illyrian ruler
- Hieronymus, tyrant of Syracuse (b. 231 BC)

213 BC

- Aratus of Sicyon, Greek statesman, general and advocate of Greek unity, who, for many years, has been the leader of the Achaean League (b. 271 BC)
- Achaeus, Seleucid general and later separatist ruler of most of Anatolia until his defeat and execution by the Seleucid king Antiochus III

212 BC

- Archimedes of Syracuse, Greek mathematician and scientist, who has calculated formulae for the areas and volumes of spheres, cylinders, parabolas and other plane and solid figures. He has also founded the science of hydrostatics, including the principle of the upthrust on a floating body which has led to his cry, "Eureka". Thirdly, he has invented siege-engines for use against the Romans and the Archimedean screw to raise water (b. c. 287 BC)
- Tiberius Sempronius Gracchus, Roman consul from 215 to 213 BC
- Xerxes of Armenia (assassinated by his wife Antiochia)

211 BC

- Arsaces I, king of Parthia from 250 BC and son of Phriapites, a chief of the seminomadic Parni tribe from the Caspian steppes
- Gnaeus Cornelius Scipio Calvus, Roman general, statesman and brother of Publius Cornelius Scipio
- Manius Pomponius Matho, Roman general, consul and maternal grandfather of Scipio Africanus
- Publius Cornelius Scipio, Roman general, consul and proconsul during the Second Punic War

210 BC

- Qin Shi Huang, first emperor of China (b. 259 BC)
- Fusu, son and heir apparent of Qin Shi Huang
- Gnaeus Fulvius Centumalus Maximus, Roman consul and general
- Meng Tian, Chinese general of the Qin dynasty
- Meng Yi, Chinese official of the Qin dynasty
- Tiberius Sempronius Longus, Roman consul and general
- Bashu Guafu Qing, Chinese businesswoman (b. 259 BC)
- Xu Fu, Chinese alchemist and explorer (b. 255 BC, disappeared at sea)
