= 210 BC =

210 BC in various calendars
Gregorian calendar	210 BC; CCX BC
Ab urbe condita	544
Ancient Egypt era	XXXIII dynasty, 114
Pharaoh	Ptolemy IV Philopator, 12
Ancient Greek Olympiad (summer)	142nd Olympiad, year 3
Assyrian calendar	4541
Balinese saka calendar	N/A
Bengali calendar	−803 – −802
Berber calendar	741
Buddhist calendar	335
Burmese calendar	−847
Byzantine calendar	5299–5300
Chinese calendar	庚寅年 (Metal Tiger); 2488 or 2281 — to — 辛卯年 (Metal Rabbit); 2489 or 2282
Coptic calendar	−493 – −492
Discordian calendar	957
Ethiopian calendar	−217 – −216
Hebrew calendar	3551–3552
- Hindu calendars
Vikram Samvat	−153 – −152
Shaka Samvat	N/A
Kali Yuga	2891–2892
Holocene calendar	9791
Iranian calendar	831 BP – 830 BP
Islamic calendar	857 BH – 856 BH
Javanese calendar	N/A
Julian calendar	N/A
Korean calendar	2124
Minguo calendar	2121 before ROC 民前2121年
Nanakshahi calendar	−1677
Seleucid era	102/103 AG
Thai solar calendar	333–334
Tibetan calendar	阳金虎年 (male Iron-Tiger) −83 or −464 or −1236 — to — 阴金兔年 (female Iron-Rabbit) −82 or −463 or −1235

Year 210 BC was a year of the pre-Julian Roman calendar. At the time it was known as the Year of the Consulship of Marcellus and Laevinus (or, less frequently, year 544 Ab urbe condita). The denomination 210 BC for this year has been used since the early medieval period, when the Anno Domini calendar era became the prevalent method in Europe for naming years.

== Events ==
=== By place ===
==== Roman Republic ====
- Following the death of his father, Publius Cornelius Scipio, and his uncle, Gnaeus Cornelius Scipio Calvus, at the hands of the Carthaginians, the young Publius Cornelius Scipio takes over command of the Roman troops in Spain. His appointment reflects the Roman Senate's dissatisfaction with the cautious strategy of the propraetor, Gaius Claudius Nero, then commander in Spain north of the Ebro.
- The famine and inflation facing Rome is eased with the pacification, by the Romans, of Sicily.
- The Carthaginian general Hannibal proves his superiority in tactics by inflicting a severe defeat at Herdonia in Apulia upon a proconsular army, slaying the consul Gnaeus Fulvius Centumalus Maximus.
- The Roman general Marcus Claudius Marcellus is elected consul for the fourth time and takes Salapia in Apulia, which has revolted and joined forces with Hannibal.
- The Spanish language evolves from Vulgar Latin, which was brought to the Iberian Peninsula by the Romans during the Second Punic War.

==== Egypt ====
- Arsinoe III, wife and sister of King Ptolemy IV gives birth to the future Ptolemy V Epiphanes. Thereafter, she is sequestered in the palace, while Ptolemy's depraved male and female favourites ruin both the king and his government of Egypt. Although Arsinoe III disapproves of the sordid state of the court, she is unable to exert any influence.

==== Greece ====
- After allying with Hannibal, Philip V of Macedon attacks the Roman positions in Illyria, but fails to take Corcyra or Apollonia, which are protected by the Roman fleet. Rome's command of the sea prevents his lending any effective aid to his Carthaginian ally in Italy. The Aetolians, Sparta and King Attalus of Pergamum join the Romans in the war against Philip V. This coalition is so strong that Philip V has to stop attacking Roman territory.

==== China ====
- Qin Er Shi becomes Emperor of the Qin dynasty of China. His advisors Zhao Gao and Prime Minister Li Si forge a decree by the late Emperor Qin Shi Huang that orders the execution of Qin Er Shi's elder brother Fusu and Fusu's ally, the general Meng Tian.
- The Terracotta Army in the mausoleum of Emperor Shihuangdi, Lintong, Shaanxi, is made (Qin dynasty) (approximate date).

== Births ==
- Hui, emperor of the Han dynasty (d. 188 BC)
- Ptolemy V Epiphanes, king of Egypt (d. 180 BC)
- Zhang Yan, Chinese empress of the Han dynasty (d. 163 BC)

== Deaths ==
- Qin Shi Huang, first emperor of China (b. 259 BC)
- Fusu, son and heir apparent of Qin Shi Huang
- Gnaeus Fulvius Centumalus Maximus, Roman consul and general
- Meng Tian, Chinese general of the Qin dynasty
- Meng Yi, Chinese official of the Qin dynasty
- Tiberius Sempronius Longus, Roman consul and general
- Bashu Guafu Qing, Chinese businesswoman (b. 259 BC)
- Xu Fu, Chinese alchemist and explorer (b. 255 BC, disappeared at sea)
