= Coinage of Amisos =

The coinage of Amissos, which includes various types of silver and bronze coins, was minted in the city of Amissos, located in Asia Minor on the coast of the Black Sea, from the last quarter of the 5th century BC until the middle of the 3rd century BC. A notable discovery in Georgia (Kobuleti) was a silver coin of Amissos from the 4th century BC, featuring on the obverse the profile of a woman—either Hera or the nymph Amissos—and on the reverse, a spread-winged eagle with the Greek inscription 'ΠΕΙΡΑ' (meaning 'trial' or 'attempt'), which refers to the city of Amissos, and dates the coin from the 5th to the 4th centuries BC.

Additionally, bronze coins of Amissos, minted between 105 and 90 BC, have been found more frequently in various locations, including Vani, Sukhumi, Mtskheta, among others. These coins feature the Gorgon Medusa on the obverse and the goddess of victory, Nike, on the reverse, accompanied by the Greek inscription 'ΑΜΙΣΟΥ' (Amissos).
