= 259 BC =

259 BC in various calendars
Gregorian calendar	259 BC; CCLIX BC
Ab urbe condita	495
Ancient Egypt era	XXXIII dynasty, 65
Pharaoh	Ptolemy II Philadelphus, 25
Ancient Greek Olympiad (summer)	130th Olympiad, year 2
Assyrian calendar	4492
Balinese saka calendar	N/A
Bengali calendar	−852 – −851
Berber calendar	692
Buddhist calendar	286
Burmese calendar	−896
Byzantine calendar	5250–5251
Chinese calendar	辛丑年 (Metal Ox); 2439 or 2232 — to — 壬寅年 (Water Tiger); 2440 or 2233
Coptic calendar	−542 – −541
Discordian calendar	908
Ethiopian calendar	−266 – −265
Hebrew calendar	3502–3503
- Hindu calendars
Vikram Samvat	−202 – −201
Shaka Samvat	N/A
Kali Yuga	2842–2843
Holocene calendar	9742
Iranian calendar	880 BP – 879 BP
Islamic calendar	907 BH – 906 BH
Javanese calendar	N/A
Julian calendar	N/A
Korean calendar	2075
Minguo calendar	2170 before ROC 民前2170年
Nanakshahi calendar	−1726
Seleucid era	53/54 AG
Thai solar calendar	284–285
Tibetan calendar	阴金牛年 (female Iron-Ox) −132 or −513 or −1285 — to — 阳水虎年 (male Water-Tiger) −131 or −512 or −1284

Year 259 BC was a year of the pre-Julian Roman calendar. At the time it was known as the Year of the Consulship of Scipio and Florus (or, less frequently, year 495 Ab urbe condita). The denomination 259 BC for this year has been used since the early medieval period, when the Anno Domini calendar era became the prevalent method in Europe for naming years.

== Events ==
=== By place ===
==== Seleucid Empire ====
- The Seleucid king Antiochus II starts the Second Syrian War against Ptolemy II Philadelphus to avenge his father's losses. Antiochus II finds a willing ally in Antigonus II Gonatas, the king of Macedonia, who has been dealing with Ptolemy II's attempts to destabilize Macedonia.

==== Sicily ====
- The Carthaginians under Hamilcar take advantage of their victory at Thermae in Sicily by counterattacking the Romans and seizing Enna. Hamilcar continues south to Camarina, in Syracusan territory, to try to convince the Syracusans to rejoin the Carthaginian side.

==== China ====
- The State of Zhou cedes to the State of Qin the Han region of Yuanyong and six cities of Zhao in exchange for peace.

== Births ==
- February 18 – Qin Shi Huang, first emperor of China (d. 210 BC)
- Bashu Guafu Qing, Chinese businesswoman (d. 210 BC)
