= 298 BC =

298 BC in various calendars
- Gregorian calendar: 298 BC; CCXCVIII BC
- Ab urbe condita: 456
- Ancient Egypt era: XXXIII dynasty, 26
- Pharaoh: Ptolemy I Soter, 26
- Ancient Greek Olympiad (summer): 120th Olympiad, year 3
- Assyrian calendar: 4453
- Balinese saka calendar: N/A
- Bengali calendar: −891 – −890
- Berber calendar: 653
- Buddhist calendar: 247
- Burmese calendar: −935
- Byzantine calendar: 5211–5212
- Chinese calendar: 壬戌年 (Water Dog); 2400 or 2193 — to — 癸亥年 (Water Pig); 2401 or 2194
- Coptic calendar: −581 – −580
- Discordian calendar: 869
- Ethiopian calendar: −305 – −304
- Hebrew calendar: 3463–3464
- Hindu calendars
- Vikram Samvat: −241 – −240
- Shaka Samvat: N/A
- Kali Yuga: 2803–2804
- Holocene calendar: 9703
- Iranian calendar: 919 BP – 918 BP
- Islamic calendar: 947 BH – 946 BH
- Javanese calendar: N/A
- Julian calendar: N/A
- Korean calendar: 2036
- Minguo calendar: 2209 before ROC 民前2209年
- Nanakshahi calendar: −1765
- Seleucid era: 14/15 AG
- Thai solar calendar: 245–246
- Tibetan calendar: ཆུ་ཕོ་ཁྱི་ལོ་ (male Water-Dog) −171 or −552 or −1324 — to — ཆུ་མོ་ཕག་ལོ་ (female Water-Boar) −170 or −551 or −1323

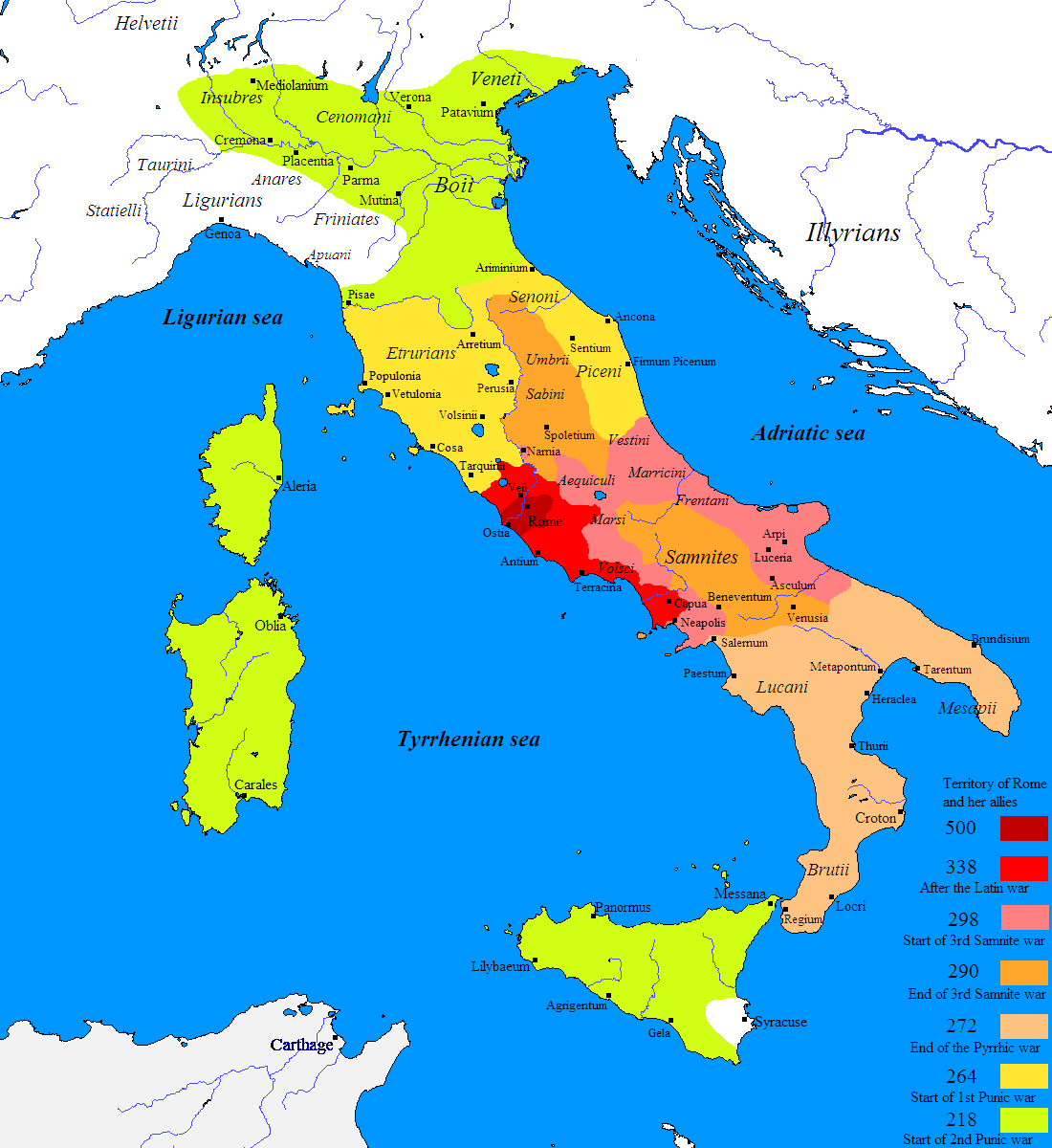
Roman expansion in Italy from 500 BC to 218 BC through the Latin War (light red), Samnite Wars (pink/orange), Pyrrhic War (beige), and First and Second Punic War (yellow and green). The Roman Republic in 298 BC is marked with dark and light red and pink.

Year 298 BC was a year of the pre-Julian Roman calendar. At the time it was known as the Year of the Consulship of Barbatus and Centumalus (or, less frequently, year 456 Ab urbe condita). The denomination 298 BC for this year has been used since the early medieval period, when the Anno Domini calendar era became the prevalent method in Europe for naming years.

== Events ==
=== By place ===
==== Roman Republic ====
- Third Samnite War:

- The consuls Lucius Cornelius Scipio Barbatus and Gnaeus Fulvius Maximus Centumalus campaign against the Etruscans. Scipio fights a costly indecisive battle near Volaterrae.
- The Lucanians seek Roman aid against the invasion of the Samnites. In agreeing to take the Lucanians under their protection, the Romans commit to war against the Samnites.
- Fulvius invades central Samnium and defeats a Samnite army near Bovianum. He then captures Aufidena and possibly also Bovianum.
- Scipio captures Taurasia and Cisauna in eastern and south-eastern Samnium and subdues anti-Roman elements in Lucania. Fulvius possibly defeats a Lucanian force as well.

==== Sicily ====
- Agathocles, king of Syracuse, assists the Italian Greeks against the Bruttians and supports the Greeks against the Romans.

==== Egypt ====
- Ptolemy gives his stepdaughter Theoxena in marriage to Agathocles, the tyrant of Syracuse (in south-eastern Sicily).
- Ptolemy finally brings the rebellious region of Cyrene under his control. He places the region under the rule of his stepson Magas.

==== India ====
- Bindusara succeeds his father Chandragupta Maurya as emperor of the Mauryan Empire.

==== China ====
- King Huai of Chu visits the State of Qin to negotiate peace but is detained.
