= 213 BC =

213 BC in various calendars
- Gregorian calendar: 213 BC; CCXIII BC
- Ab urbe condita: 541
- Ancient Egypt era: XXXIII dynasty, 111
- Pharaoh: Ptolemy IV Philopator, 9
- Ancient Greek Olympiad (summer): 141st Olympiad, year 4
- Assyrian calendar: 4538
- Balinese saka calendar: N/A
- Bengali calendar: −806 – −805
- Berber calendar: 738
- Buddhist calendar: 332
- Burmese calendar: −850
- Byzantine calendar: 5296–5297
- Chinese calendar: 丁亥年 (Fire Pig); 2485 or 2278 — to — 戊子年 (Earth Rat); 2486 or 2279
- Coptic calendar: −496 – −495
- Discordian calendar: 954
- Ethiopian calendar: −220 – −219
- Hebrew calendar: 3548–3549
- Hindu calendars
- Vikram Samvat: −156 – −155
- Shaka Samvat: N/A
- Kali Yuga: 2888–2889
- Holocene calendar: 9788
- Iranian calendar: 834 BP – 833 BP
- Islamic calendar: 860 BH – 859 BH
- Javanese calendar: N/A
- Julian calendar: N/A
- Korean calendar: 2121
- Minguo calendar: 2124 before ROC 民前2124年
- Nanakshahi calendar: −1680
- Seleucid era: 99/100 AG
- Thai solar calendar: 330–331
- Tibetan calendar: མེ་མོ་ཕག་ལོ་ (female Fire-Boar) −86 or −467 or −1239 — to — ས་ཕོ་བྱི་བ་ལོ་ (male Earth-Rat) −85 or −466 or −1238

Year 213 BC was a year of the pre-Julian Roman calendar. At the time it was known as the Year of the Consulship of Maximus and Gracchus (or, less frequently, year 541 Ab urbe condita). The denomination 213 BC for this year has been used since the early medieval period, when the Anno Domini calendar era became the prevalent method in Europe for naming years.

== Events ==
=== By place ===
==== Seleucid Empire ====
- In alliance with Attalus I of Pergamum, Antiochus III finally captures the rebel king of Anatolia, Achaeus, in his capital, Sardis, after a siege of two years. Antiochus III then has Achaeus executed.

==== Roman Republic ====
- Casilinum and Arpi are recovered by the Romans from Hannibal.

==== Sicily ====
- Archimedes's war machines repel the Roman army that is invading Syracuse.

==== China ====
- Emperor Qin Shi Huang and Prime Minister Li Si order all Confucian writings destroyed in the burning of books and burying of scholars.

== Deaths ==
- Aratus of Sicyon, Greek statesman, general and advocate of Greek unity, who, for many years, has been the leader of the Achaean League (b. 271 BC)
- Achaeus, Seleucid general and later separatist ruler of most of Anatolia until his defeat and execution by the Seleucid king Antiochus III
