= 299 BC =

299 BC in various calendars
Gregorian calendar	299 BC; CCXCIX BC
Ab urbe condita	455
Ancient Egypt era	XXXIII dynasty, 25
Pharaoh	Ptolemy I Soter, 25
Ancient Greek Olympiad (summer)	120th Olympiad, year 2
Assyrian calendar	4452
Balinese saka calendar	N/A
Bengali calendar	−892 – −891
Berber calendar	652
Buddhist calendar	246
Burmese calendar	−936
Byzantine calendar	5210–5211
Chinese calendar	辛酉年 (Metal Rooster); 2399 or 2192 — to — 壬戌年 (Water Dog); 2400 or 2193
Coptic calendar	−582 – −581
Discordian calendar	868
Ethiopian calendar	−306 – −305
Hebrew calendar	3462–3463
- Hindu calendars
Vikram Samvat	−242 – −241
Shaka Samvat	N/A
Kali Yuga	2802–2803
Holocene calendar	9702
Iranian calendar	920 BP – 919 BP
Islamic calendar	948 BH – 947 BH
Javanese calendar	N/A
Julian calendar	N/A
Korean calendar	2035
Minguo calendar	2210 before ROC 民前2210年
Nanakshahi calendar	−1766
Seleucid era	13/14 AG
Thai solar calendar	244–245
Tibetan calendar	阴金鸡年 (female Iron-Rooster) −172 or −553 or −1325 — to — 阳水狗年 (male Water-Dog) −171 or −552 or −1324

Year 299 BC was a year of the pre-Julian Roman calendar. At the time it was known as the Year of the Consulship of Paetinus and Torquatus/Corvus (or, less frequently, year 455 Ab urbe condita). The denomination 299 BC for this year has been used since the early medieval period, when the Anno Domini calendar era became the prevalent method in Europe for naming years.

== Events ==
=== By place ===
==== Roman Republic ====
- The consul Marcus Fulvius Paetinus sacks the Umbrian city of Nequinum, which Rome had been besieging since the previous year, and he possibly also fights with success against the Sabines.
- Third Samnite War:

- A coalition of raiders from Cisalpine and Transalpine Gaul invade Etruria and are paid off by the Etruscans.
- Rome accuses the Etruscans of seeking to ally with the Gauls against Rome. The consul Titus Manlius Torquatus marches an army into Etruria but dies three days after falling from his horse. The new consul Marcus Valerius Corvus ravages Etruria, destroying villages in an attempt to provoke the Etruscans into battle.
- Rome allies with the Picentes.
- The Samnites invade Lucania after the latter refuses to join them in alliance. The Lucanians suffer several defeats and lose multiple towns.

==== China ====
- The State of Qin annexes eight cities of the state of Chu. Chu then sends an envoy to ask the King of Huai to go to Qin to negotiate peace. Qu Yuan risks his life to go up to the court to persuade the King of Huai not to go to the negotiation.
- The State of Zhao annexes the State of Zhongshan.
- King Wuling of Zhao abdicates the throne of Zhao to his son.

== Deaths ==
- Titus Manlius Torquatus, Roman consul
