= 163 BC =

163 BC in various calendars
- Gregorian calendar: 163 BC; CLXIII BC
- Ab urbe condita: 591
- Ancient Egypt era: XXXIII dynasty, 161
- Pharaoh: Ptolemy VI Philometor, 18
- Ancient Greek Olympiad (summer): 154th Olympiad, year 2
- Assyrian calendar: 4588
- Balinese saka calendar: N/A
- Bengali calendar: −756 – −755
- Berber calendar: 788
- Buddhist calendar: 382
- Burmese calendar: −800
- Byzantine calendar: 5346–5347
- Chinese calendar: 丁丑年 (Fire Ox); 2535 or 2328 — to — 戊寅年 (Earth Tiger); 2536 or 2329
- Coptic calendar: −446 – −445
- Discordian calendar: 1004
- Ethiopian calendar: −170 – −169
- Hebrew calendar: 3598–3599
- Hindu calendars
- Vikram Samvat: −106 – −105
- Shaka Samvat: N/A
- Kali Yuga: 2938–2939
- Holocene calendar: 9838
- Iranian calendar: 784 BP – 783 BP
- Islamic calendar: 808 BH – 807 BH
- Javanese calendar: N/A
- Julian calendar: N/A
- Korean calendar: 2171
- Minguo calendar: 2074 before ROC 民前2074年
- Nanakshahi calendar: −1630
- Seleucid era: 149/150 AG
- Thai solar calendar: 380–381
- Tibetan calendar: མེ་མོ་གླང་ལོ་ (female Fire-Ox) −36 or −417 or −1189 — to — ས་ཕོ་སྟག་ལོ་ (male Earth-Tiger) −35 or −416 or −1188

Year 163 BC was a year of the pre-Julian Roman calendar. At the time it was known as the Year of the Consulship of Gracchus and Thalna (or, less frequently, year 591 Ab urbe condita) and the First Year of Houyuan (後元). The denomination 163 BC for this year has been used since the early medieval period, when the Anno Domini calendar era became the prevalent method in Europe for naming years.

== Events ==
=== By place ===
==== Egypt ====
- The Ptolemaic king Ptolemy VI Philometor is restored to his throne through the intervention of the citizens of Alexandria. However, the Romans intervene and partition the kingdom, giving Ptolemy VIII Euergetes Cyrenaica and Ptolemy VI Cyprus and Egypt. The two brothers accept the Roman partition.

==== Seleucid Empire ====
- In the turmoil following the death of Antiochus IV, the governor of Media, Timarchus becomes the independent ruler of Media, opposing Lysias who is acting as regent for young king Antiochus V Eupator.
- Maccabean Revolt:
  - Regent Lysias tries to make peace with the Jews in Judea. He offers them full religious freedom if they will lay down their arms. Moderates including the Hasideans consent, but Judas Maccabeus argues for full political as well as religious freedom.
  - Maccabee campaigns of 163 BC: The Maccabees attack nearby regions to Judea, fighting in a civil conflict between Gentiles and Jews.

==== Roman Republic ====
- The Roman playwright Terence's play Heauton Timorumenos ("The Self-Tormentor") is first performed.

== Births ==
- Marcus Aemilius Scaurus, Roman politician and ambassador (d. 89 BC)
- Tiberius Sempronius Gracchus, Roman politician, who, as a plebeian tribune, will cause political turmoil in the Republic through his attempts to legislate agrarian reforms; his political ideals will eventually lead to his death at the hands of supporters of the conservative faction (Optimates) of the Roman Senate (d. 132 BC)

== Deaths ==
- Xin Zhui, Chinese noblewoman
- Zhang Yan, known formally as Empress Xiaohui, empress of the Chinese Han dynasty (b. 202 BC)
- Manius Juventius Thalna, Roman consul (b. before 206 BC)
