= 214 BC =

214 BC in various calendars
Gregorian calendar	214 BC; CCXIV BC
Ab urbe condita	540
Ancient Egypt era	XXXIII dynasty, 110
Pharaoh	Ptolemy IV Philopator, 8
Ancient Greek Olympiad (summer)	141st Olympiad, year 3
Assyrian calendar	4537
Balinese saka calendar	N/A
Bengali calendar	−807 – −806
Berber calendar	737
Buddhist calendar	331
Burmese calendar	−851
Byzantine calendar	5295–5296
Chinese calendar	丙戌年 (Fire Dog); 2484 or 2277 — to — 丁亥年 (Fire Pig); 2485 or 2278
Coptic calendar	−497 – −496
Discordian calendar	953
Ethiopian calendar	−221 – −220
Hebrew calendar	3547–3548
- Hindu calendars
Vikram Samvat	−157 – −156
Shaka Samvat	N/A
Kali Yuga	2887–2888
Holocene calendar	9787
Iranian calendar	835 BP – 834 BP
Islamic calendar	861 BH – 860 BH
Javanese calendar	N/A
Julian calendar	N/A
Korean calendar	2120
Minguo calendar	2125 before ROC 民前2125年
Nanakshahi calendar	−1681
Seleucid era	98/99 AG
Thai solar calendar	329–330
Tibetan calendar	མེ་ཕོ་ཁྱི་ལོ་ (male Fire-Dog) −87 or −468 or −1240 — to — མེ་མོ་ཕག་ལོ་ (female Fire-Boar) −86 or −467 or −1239

Year 214 BC was a year of the pre-Julian Roman calendar. At the time it was known as the Year of the Consulship of Verrucosus and Marcellus (or, less frequently, year 540 Ab urbe condita). The denomination 214 BC for this year has been used since the early medieval period, when the Anno Domini calendar era became the prevalent method in Europe for naming years.

== Events ==
=== By place ===
==== Carthage ====
- Carthage persuades Syracuse to revolt against Rome and ally itself with Carthage instead.

==== Roman Republic ====
- Roman legions led by Tiberius Sempronius Gracchus defeat Hanno's Carthaginian forces in a battle near Beneventum, thus denying Hannibal much needed reinforcements.
- The Roman general, Marcus Claudius Marcellus, who is in Sicily at the time of the revolt of Syracuse, leads an army which storms Leontini and besieges Syracuse. With the help of Archimedes' ideas and inventions, the Syracusans repel his attacks by sea.
- The censors Publius Furius Philus and Marcus Atilius Regulus condemn and degrade (i.e. cause to lose rank in Roman society and politics) two groups of Romans of high rank, including senators and equestrians. The first group are those Roman officers captured by Hannibal's forces in the Battle of Cannae who have come as Carthaginian hostages to Rome to plead for their ransom (and those of their fellow prisoners), and who then refuse to return to Carthaginian captivity when the Senate refuses to ransom any prisoners. The second group are those Romans who have advocated surrender to Carthage after the Battle of Cannae, or who have made plans to flee Rome and offer their services in Greece, Egypt, or Asia Minor.
- Romans retake Samnium

==== Greece ====
- Philip V of Macedon attempts an invasion of Illyria by sea with a fleet of 120 craft. He captures Oricum and, sailing up the Aous (modern Vjosë) river, he besieges Apollonia.
- Upon receiving word from Oricum of Philip V's actions in Illyria, Roman propraetor Marcus Valerius Laevinus crosses the Adriatic with his fleet and army. Landing at Oricum, Laevinus is able to retake the town with little fighting.
- Laevinus sends 2,000 men under the command of Quintus Naevius Crista, to Apollonia. Catching Philip's forces by surprise, Quintus Naevius Crista attacks and routs their camp. Philip V is able to escape back to Macedonia, after burning his fleet and leaving many thousands of his men dead or as prisoners of the Romans.

==== China ====
- Panyu (present-day Guangzhou, or Canton) is established as a city.
- Qin Shi Huang orders general Ren Xiao (任囂), commanding 200,000 troops, to conquer the kingdoms in present-day northern Vietnam.
- Qin Shi Huang orders the construction of Lingqu, the oldest contour canal.
- The Qin armies under Meng Tian campaign against the Xiongnu and other northern peoples and expand their territories along the north basin of the Yellow River. They subjugate the Luliang region, drive back the Xiongnu tribes to the northwest of the Ordos Plateau, and seize Gaoque, Mt. Tao and Beijia.

== Deaths ==
- Demetrius of Pharos, Illyrian ruler
- Hieronymus, tyrant of Syracuse (b. 231 BC)
