= 258 BC =

258 BC in various calendars
- Gregorian calendar: 258 BC; CCLVIII BC
- Ab urbe condita: 496
- Ancient Egypt era: XXXIII dynasty, 66
- Pharaoh: Ptolemy II Philadelphus, 26
- Ancient Greek Olympiad (summer): 130th Olympiad, year 3
- Assyrian calendar: 4493
- Balinese saka calendar: N/A
- Bengali calendar: −851 – −850
- Berber calendar: 693
- Buddhist calendar: 287
- Burmese calendar: −895
- Byzantine calendar: 5251–5252
- Chinese calendar: 壬寅年 (Water Tiger); 2440 or 2233 — to — 癸卯年 (Water Rabbit); 2441 or 2234
- Coptic calendar: −541 – −540
- Discordian calendar: 909
- Ethiopian calendar: −265 – −264
- Hebrew calendar: 3503–3504
- Hindu calendars
- Vikram Samvat: −201 – −200
- Shaka Samvat: N/A
- Kali Yuga: 2843–2844
- Holocene calendar: 9743
- Iranian calendar: 879 BP – 878 BP
- Islamic calendar: 906 BH – 905 BH
- Javanese calendar: N/A
- Julian calendar: N/A
- Korean calendar: 2076
- Minguo calendar: 2169 before ROC 民前2169年
- Nanakshahi calendar: −1725
- Seleucid era: 54/55 AG
- Thai solar calendar: 285–286
- Tibetan calendar: ཆུ་ཕོ་སྟག་ལོ་ (male Water-Tiger) −131 or −512 or −1284 — to — ཆུ་མོ་ཡོས་ལོ་ (female Water-Hare) −130 or −511 or −1283

Year 258 BC was a year of the pre-Julian Roman calendar. At the time it was known as the Year of the Consulship of Calatinus and Peterculus (or, less frequently, year 496 Ab urbe condita). The denomination 258 BC for this year has been used since the early medieval period, when the Anno Domini calendar era became the prevalent method in Europe for naming years.

== Events ==
=== By place ===
==== Roman Republic ====
- The Romans are able to regain the initiative in Sicily against Carthage by retaking Enna and Camarina. In central Sicily, they take the town of Mytistraton, which they have attacked twice previously. The Romans also move in the north by marching across the northern coast toward Panormus, but are not able to take the city due to the city's heavily fortified walls.
- Gaius Duilius Nepos, the Roman commander who has won a major naval victory over the Carthaginians is made censor with Lucius Cornelius Scipio. The election of a novus homo (i.e. the first in his family to serve in the Roman Senate or be elected as consul) to the censorship is a very rare honor.

==== Egypt ====
- Ptolemy II loses control of the territory of Cyrenaica.
- Erasistratus of Ceos founds a medical school at Alexandria.

==== Greece ====
- The forces of the Macedonian King Antigonus II and the Seleucid King Antiochus II win a naval victory at Cos against their common enemy, Ptolemy II. This victory secures Antigonus control over the Aegean Sea and the League of the Islanders. It also diminishes Ptolemaic naval power.

==== China ====
- The State of Qin besieges Handan, the capital of the State of Zhou, but the Qin army under Wang Ling sustains heavy casualties. Wang Ling is then replaced by Wang He.
- The merchant Lu Buwei rescues the Qin prince Ying Yiren, a hostage at the Zhao court, from Handan. Ying Yiren will eventually become King Zhuangxiang of Qin.

==== Vietnam ====
- According to legend, the Hồng Bàng dynasty comes to an end.
