= 231 BC =

231 BC in various calendars
Gregorian calendar	231 BC; CCXXXI BC
Ab urbe condita	523
Ancient Egypt era	XXXIII dynasty, 93
Pharaoh	Ptolemy III Euergetes, 16
Ancient Greek Olympiad (summer)	137th Olympiad, year 2
Assyrian calendar	4520
Balinese saka calendar	N/A
Bengali calendar	−824 – −823
Berber calendar	720
Buddhist calendar	314
Burmese calendar	−868
Byzantine calendar	5278–5279
Chinese calendar	己巳年 (Earth Snake); 2467 or 2260 — to — 庚午年 (Metal Horse); 2468 or 2261
Coptic calendar	−514 – −513
Discordian calendar	936
Ethiopian calendar	−238 – −237
Hebrew calendar	3530–3531
- Hindu calendars
Vikram Samvat	−174 – −173
Shaka Samvat	N/A
Kali Yuga	2870–2871
Holocene calendar	9770
Iranian calendar	852 BP – 851 BP
Islamic calendar	878 BH – 877 BH
Javanese calendar	N/A
Julian calendar	N/A
Korean calendar	2103
Minguo calendar	2142 before ROC 民前2142年
Nanakshahi calendar	−1698
Seleucid era	81/82 AG
Thai solar calendar	312–313
Tibetan calendar	阴土蛇年 (female Earth-Snake) −104 or −485 or −1257 — to — 阳金马年 (male Iron-Horse) −103 or −484 or −1256

Year 231 BC was a year of the pre-Julian Roman calendar. At the time it was known as the Year of the Consulship of Matho and Maso (or, less frequently, year 523 Ab urbe condita). The denomination 231 BC for this year has been used since the early medieval period, when the Anno Domini calendar era became the prevalent method in Europe for naming years.

== Events ==
=== By place ===
==== Greece ====
- Demetrius II, king of Macedonia, seeks military help from Agron, king of Illyria, a loosely organized state on the Adriatic coast north of Epirus, against the advancing Aetolians. The Illyrian army routs the Aetolians and returns home as the victor.

==== Roman Republic ====
- The Romans send envoys to Massilia (modern Marseille, France) to negotiate with the Carthaginian general Hamilcar Barca who is based there.

== Births ==
- Hieronymus, tyrant of Syracuse (d. 214 BC)
- Han Xin, prominent Chinese general of the early Han dynasty is born.

== Deaths ==
- Agron, king of the Ardiaean Kingdom (Western Balkans)
