= 274 BC =

274 BC in various calendars
- Gregorian calendar: 274 BC; CCLXXIV BC
- Ab urbe condita: 480
- Ancient Egypt era: XXXIII dynasty, 50
- Pharaoh: Ptolemy II Philadelphus, 10
- Ancient Greek Olympiad (summer): 126th Olympiad, year 3
- Assyrian calendar: 4477
- Balinese saka calendar: N/A
- Bengali calendar: −867 – −866
- Berber calendar: 677
- Buddhist calendar: 271
- Burmese calendar: −911
- Byzantine calendar: 5235–5236
- Chinese calendar: 丙戌年 (Fire Dog); 2424 or 2217 — to — 丁亥年 (Fire Pig); 2425 or 2218
- Coptic calendar: −557 – −556
- Discordian calendar: 893
- Ethiopian calendar: −281 – −280
- Hebrew calendar: 3487–3488
- Hindu calendars
- Vikram Samvat: −217 – −216
- Shaka Samvat: N/A
- Kali Yuga: 2827–2828
- Holocene calendar: 9727
- Iranian calendar: 895 BP – 894 BP
- Islamic calendar: 923 BH – 921 BH
- Javanese calendar: N/A
- Julian calendar: N/A
- Korean calendar: 2060
- Minguo calendar: 2185 before ROC 民前2185年
- Nanakshahi calendar: −1741
- Seleucid era: 38/39 AG
- Thai solar calendar: 269–270
- Tibetan calendar: མེ་ཕོ་ཁྱི་ལོ་ (male Fire-Dog) −147 or −528 or −1300 — to — མེ་མོ་ཕག་ལོ་ (female Fire-Boar) −146 or −527 or −1299

Year 274 BC was a year of the pre-Julian Roman calendar. At the time it was known as the Year of the Consulship of Dentatus and Merenda (or, less frequently, year 480 Ab urbe condita). The denomination 274 BC for this year has been used since the early medieval period, when the Anno Domini calendar era became the prevalent method in Europe for naming years.

== Events ==
=== By place ===
==== Greece ====
- Pyrrhus returns from Italy and Sicily and invades Macedonia defeating Antigonus II Gonatas at the Battle of the Aous and conquering Upper Macedonia and Thessaly while Antigonus holds onto the coastal Macedonian towns. Antigonus' troops desert him and Pyrrhus is declared King of Macedonia.

==== Roman Republic ====
- The Romans under Manius Curius Dentatus conquer the Lucanians.

==== Egypt ====
- Magas of Cyrene marries Apama, the daughter of Antiochus and uses his marital alliance to foment a pact to invade Egypt. He opens hostilities against his half brother Ptolemy II, by declaring his province of Cyrenaica to be independent and then attacks Egypt from the west as Antiochus I takes the Egyptian controlled areas in coastal Syria and southern Anatolia, after which he attacks Palestine.
- Magas has to stop his advance against Ptolemy II due to an internal revolt by the Libyan Marmaridae nomads.
