= 271 BC =

271 BC in various calendars
- Gregorian calendar: 271 BC; CCLXXI BC
- Ab urbe condita: 483
- Ancient Egypt era: XXXIII dynasty, 53
- Pharaoh: Ptolemy II Philadelphus, 13
- Ancient Greek Olympiad (summer): 127th Olympiad, year 2
- Assyrian calendar: 4480
- Balinese saka calendar: N/A
- Bengali calendar: −864 – −863
- Berber calendar: 680
- Buddhist calendar: 274
- Burmese calendar: −908
- Byzantine calendar: 5238–5239
- Chinese calendar: 己丑年 (Earth Ox); 2427 or 2220 — to — 庚寅年 (Metal Tiger); 2428 or 2221
- Coptic calendar: −554 – −553
- Discordian calendar: 896
- Ethiopian calendar: −278 – −277
- Hebrew calendar: 3490–3491
- Hindu calendars
- Vikram Samvat: −214 – −213
- Shaka Samvat: N/A
- Kali Yuga: 2830–2831
- Holocene calendar: 9730
- Iranian calendar: 892 BP – 891 BP
- Islamic calendar: 919 BH – 918 BH
- Javanese calendar: N/A
- Julian calendar: N/A
- Korean calendar: 2063
- Minguo calendar: 2182 before ROC 民前2182年
- Nanakshahi calendar: −1738
- Seleucid era: 41/42 AG
- Thai solar calendar: 272–273
- Tibetan calendar: ས་མོ་གླང་ལོ་ (female Earth-Ox) −144 or −525 or −1297 — to — ལྕགས་ཕོ་སྟག་ལོ་ (male Iron-Tiger) −143 or −524 or −1296

Year 271 BC was a year of the pre-Julian Roman calendar. At the time it was known as the Year of the Consulship of Claudus and Clepsina (or, less frequently, year 483 Ab urbe condita). The denomination 271 BC for this year has been used since the early medieval period, when the Anno Domini calendar era became the prevalent method in Europe for naming years.

== Events ==
=== By place ===
==== Greece ====
- With the restoration of the territories captured by Pyrrhus, and with grateful allies in Sparta and Argos, and garrisons in Corinth and other Greek key cities, Antigonus II securely controls Macedonia and the other states of Greece. Antigonus becomes the chief of the Thessalian League and is on good terms with neighbouring Illyria and Thrace. He secures his position in central and south Greece by keeping Macedonian occupation forces in the cities of Corinth, Chalcis on the island of Euboea, and Demetrias in Thessaly, the three "shackles" of Hellas.

==== India ====
- The Mauryan empire annexes the southern kingdoms till the realms of the three crowned kings of Chola, Chera and Pandya.

== Births ==
- Aratus of Sicyon, Greek general (strategos) and statesman (d. 213 BC)
