= 206 BC =

206 BC in various calendars
- Gregorian calendar: 206 BC; CCVI BC
- Ab urbe condita: 548
- Ancient Egypt era: XXXIII dynasty, 118
- Pharaoh: Ptolemy IV Philopator, 16
- Ancient Greek Olympiad (summer): 143rd Olympiad, year 3
- Assyrian calendar: 4545
- Balinese saka calendar: N/A
- Bengali calendar: −799 – −798
- Berber calendar: 745
- Buddhist calendar: 339
- Burmese calendar: −843
- Byzantine calendar: 5303–5304
- Chinese calendar: 甲午年 (Wood Horse); 2492 or 2285 — to — 乙未年 (Wood Goat); 2493 or 2286
- Coptic calendar: −489 – −488
- Discordian calendar: 961
- Ethiopian calendar: −213 – −212
- Hebrew calendar: 3555–3556
- Hindu calendars
- Vikram Samvat: −149 – −148
- Shaka Samvat: N/A
- Kali Yuga: 2895–2896
- Holocene calendar: 9795
- Iranian calendar: 827 BP – 826 BP
- Islamic calendar: 852 BH – 851 BH
- Javanese calendar: N/A
- Julian calendar: N/A
- Korean calendar: 2128
- Minguo calendar: 2117 before ROC 民前2117年
- Nanakshahi calendar: −1673
- Seleucid era: 106/107 AG
- Thai solar calendar: 337–338
- Tibetan calendar: ཤིང་ཕོ་རྟ་ལོ་ (male Wood-Horse) −79 or −460 or −1232 — to — ཤིང་མོ་ལུག་ལོ་ (female Wood-Sheep) −78 or −459 or −1231

Year 206 BC was a year of the pre-Julian Roman calendar. At the time it was known as the Year of the Consulship of Philo and Metellus (or, less frequently, year 548 Ab urbe condita). The denomination 206 BC for this year has been used since the early medieval period, when the Anno Domini calendar era became the prevalent method in Europe for naming years.

== Events ==
=== By place ===
==== Roman Republic ====
- In the Battle of Ilipa (Alcalá del Río, near Seville) in Spain, the Carthaginian generals, Mago Barca and Hasdrubal Gisco, are defeated by the Roman general Publius Cornelius Scipio. Mago retreats to Gades (modern Cádiz) and then sails for the Balearic Islands.
- The Roman general Publius Cornelius Scipio secures Gades, thus making Roman control of Spain complete. With the effective withdrawal of the Carthaginians from Spain, Hispania becomes a Roman province.
- The city of Italica (northwest of modern Seville, Spain) is founded by Scipio as a place to settle for the Roman soldiers wounded in the Battle of Ilipa.
- After having successfully driven the Carthaginians out of Spain, Scipio returns in triumph to Rome and is elected consul. He then prepares to carry the war into Carthage's territory in North Africa.

==== Carthage ====
- Hasdrubal Gisco retreats to the coast and then crosses to North Africa, where he gives his daughter in marriage to Syphax, king of the Numidian Masaesyli tribe, to formalize their military alliance.
- After being an ally of Carthage and fighting with them, Numidian chieftain, Masinissa switches sides when the Carthaginians are driven from Spain and offers to assist Rome. Syphax expels his rival Masinissa and claims himself to be King of Numidia. The Romans support Masinissa's claim to the Numidian throne against Syphax, the pro-Carthaginian ruler of the Masaesyli tribe.

==== Persia ====
- Arsaces II, king of the Parthians, loses territory in battles with Euthydemus I, ruler of Bactria.
- Antiochus III marches across the Hindu Kush into the Kabul valley and renews his friendship with the Indian king Sophagasenus.

==== Greece ====
- The war between Macedonia and Rome drags on with no decisive advantage on either side. Rome's interest lies not in conquest, but in keeping Macedon, the Greek city-states and Greek political leagues continually divided and non-threatening.
- Philip V of Macedon is able to take advantage of Roman inactivity. After sacking Thermum, the religious and political centre of Aetolia, Philip is able to force the Aetolians to accept a peace treaty based on his terms.

==== China ====
- A period of civil war known as the Chu-Han contention begins.
- Xiang Yu divides China in a power-sharing arrangement known as the Eighteen Kingdoms, with himself the de facto supreme ruler as Hegemon-King of Western Chu.
- Xiang Yu appoints Huai II of Chu as Emperor Yi of China, but he has him assassinated later in the year.
- Liu Bang, as the newly appointed king of Hanzhong, and his new General-in-Chief Han Xin, invade Guanzhong, defeat the king of Yong, Zhang Han, and conquer the lands of the Three Qins, thus beginning hostilities with Xiang Yu.
- Liu Bang makes Yueyang his capital and begins to expand his realm into the Central Plain.
- Xiang Yu campaigns against a rebellion in Qi.
- The Jian and Dao swords are created during this time (approximate date).

== Deaths ==
- Chrysippus, Greek Stoic philosopher (approximate date)
- Han Cheng, Chinese ruler of the Eighteen Kingdoms
- Han Guang, Chinese ruler of the Eighteen Kingdoms
- Scerdilaidas, Illyrian king of the Ardiaean Kingdom
- Yi (or Huai II), Chinese ruler of the Chu State
- Ziying, Chinese ruler of the Qin Dynasty
