= 300 BC =

300 BC in various calendars
- Gregorian calendar: 300 BC; CCC BC
- Ab urbe condita: 454
- Ancient Egypt era: XXXIII dynasty, 24
- Pharaoh: Ptolemy I Soter, 24
- Ancient Greek Olympiad (summer): 120th Olympiad (victor)¹
- Assyrian calendar: 4451
- Balinese saka calendar: N/A
- Bengali calendar: −893 – −892
- Berber calendar: 651
- Buddhist calendar: 245
- Burmese calendar: −937
- Byzantine calendar: 5209–5210
- Chinese calendar: 庚申年 (Metal Monkey); 2398 or 2191 — to — 辛酉年 (Metal Rooster); 2399 or 2192
- Coptic calendar: −583 – −582
- Discordian calendar: 867
- Ethiopian calendar: −307 – −306
- Hebrew calendar: 3461–3462
- Hindu calendars
- Vikram Samvat: −243 – −242
- Shaka Samvat: N/A
- Kali Yuga: 2801–2802
- Holocene calendar: 9701
- Iranian calendar: 921 BP – 920 BP
- Islamic calendar: 949 BH – 948 BH
- Javanese calendar: N/A
- Julian calendar: N/A
- Korean calendar: 2034
- Minguo calendar: 2211 before ROC 民前2211年
- Nanakshahi calendar: −1767
- Seleucid era: 12/13 AG
- Thai solar calendar: 243–244
- Tibetan calendar: ལྕགས་ཕོ་སྤྲེ་ལོ་ (male Iron-Monkey) −173 or −554 or −1326 — to — ལྕགས་མོ་བྱ་ལོ་ (female Iron-Bird) −172 or −553 or −1325

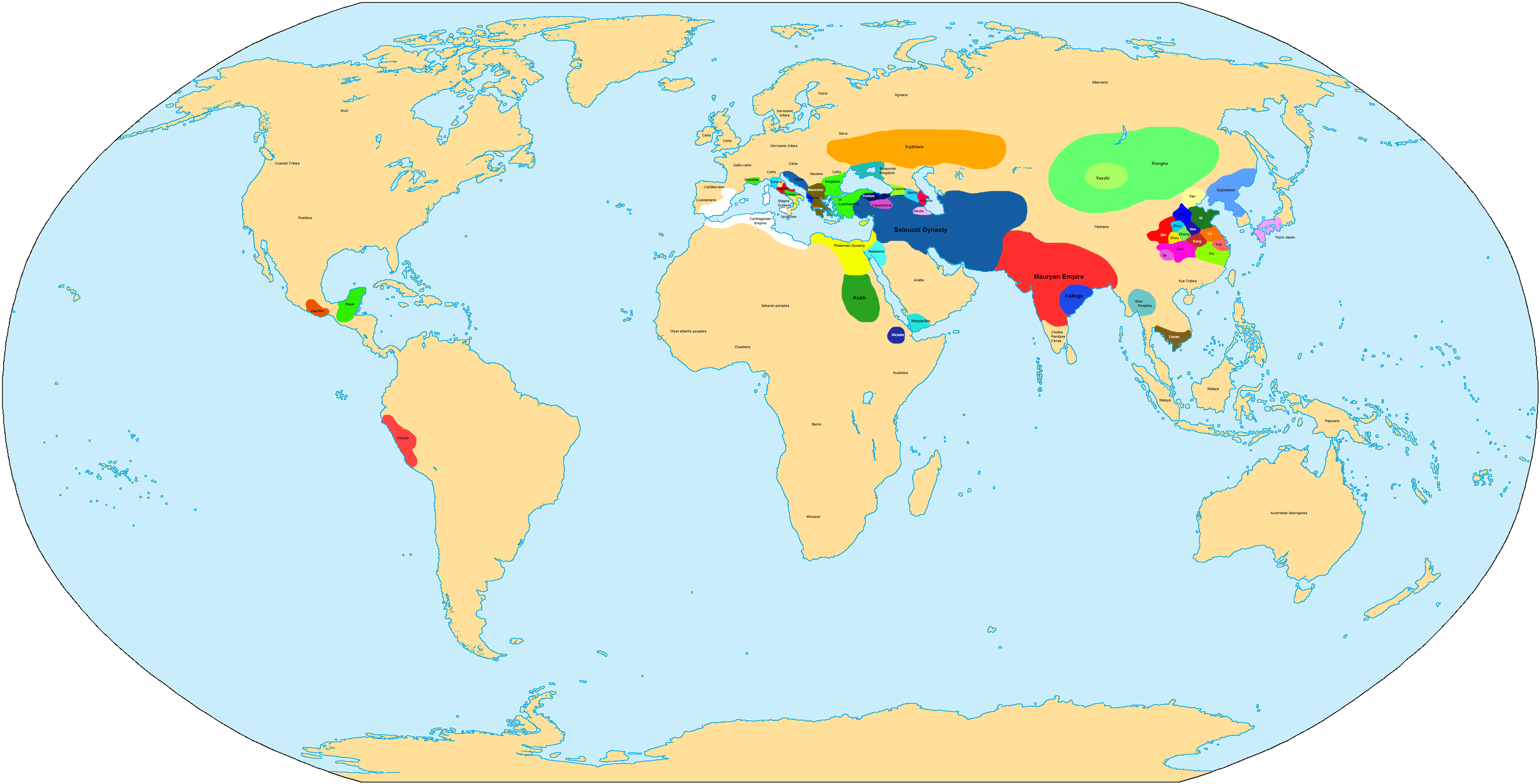
Map of the world in 300 BC. A coin used as currency during 300 BC in ancient Greece.

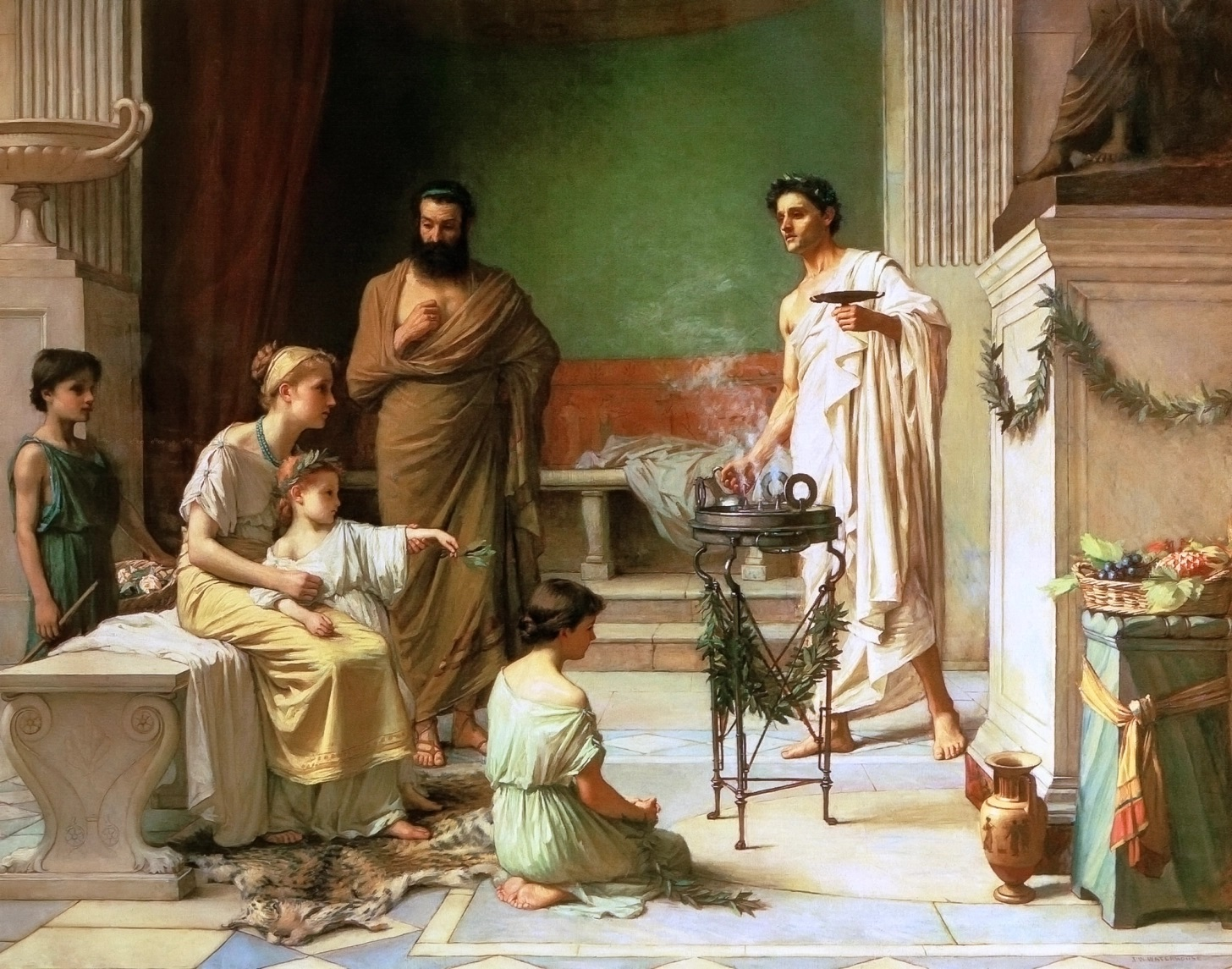
A sick child brought into the Temple of Asclepieion, by Waterhouse (1877)

Year 300 BC was a year of the pre-Julian Roman calendar. At the time it was known as the Year of the Consulship of Corvus and Pansa (or, less frequently, year 454 Ab urbe condita). The denomination 300 BC for this year has been used since the early medieval period, when the Anno Domini calendar era became the prevalent method in Europe for naming years.

== Events ==
=== By place ===
==== Greece ====
- Pilgrims travel to the healing temples of Asclepieion to be cured of their ills. After a ritual purification the followers bring offerings or sacrifices.

==== Egypt ====
- Pyrrhus, the King of Epirus, is taken as a hostage to Egypt after the Battle of Ipsus and makes a diplomatic marriage with the princess Antigone, daughter of Ptolemy and Berenice.
- Ptolemy concludes an alliance with King Lysimachus of Thrace and gives him his daughter Arsinoe II in marriage.

==== China ====
- Warring States period

==== Seleucid Empire ====
- Seleucus founds the city of Antioch, some 20 miles up the Orontes River, naming it after his father.
- After the death of his wife Apama, Seleucus marries Stratonice, daughter of Demetrius Poliorcetes.

=== By topic ===
==== Art ====
- In Pella, the capital of Macedonia, the artist Gnosis creates his Stag Hunt mosaic floor decoration.
