= Widow Qing =

Widow Qing (Chinese: 寡妇清; pinyin: Guǎfù Qīng, 259–210 BC) was a Ba-Shu businesswoman in the Qin dynasty in China.

Widow Qing lived in Fuling in Ba (present day Chongqing). Qing was her given name, with her surname unknown. Her husband died when she was still young and she never remarried. She belonged to the family who controlled the cinnabar mines in Changshou, which she managed herself as a widow. She is recorded in historical accounts for her good business relationship to Emperor Qin Shi Huang, over whom she wielded a great deal of influence because of their business transactions and her substantial economic power. The emperor constructed a memorial tower (女懷清臺) in her honour.

She has been the subject of a TV-series in China.
