= 143 =

143 may refer to:

- 143 (number), the natural number following 142 and preceding 144
- AD 143, a year of the 2nd century AD
- 143 BC, a year of the 2nd century BC
- 143 (West Midlands) Brigade, UK Infantry unit
- KiYa 143, a locomotive type
- 143 Adria, a main-belt asteroid

== Film ==
- 143 (2004 film), an Indian Telugu film
- 143 (2022 film), an Indian Marathi film

== Music ==
- 143 Records, record label of producer David Foster
- 143 (Bars and Melody album), 2015
- 143 (Katy Perry album), 2024
- 143 (EP), a 2013 EP by Tiffany Evans
- "1-4-3 (I Love You)", a 2013 song by Henry Lau from the EP Trap

== Public transport ==
- R143, a subway car fleet for the B Division of the New York City Subway

== See also ==
- "Case 143", a 2022 song by Stray Kids
- List of highways numbered 143
