= 147 =

147 may refer to:

- 147 (number), the natural number following 146 and preceding 148
- AD 147, a year of the Julian calendar, in the second century
- 147 BC, a year of the pre-Julian Roman calendar
- 147 AH, a year in the Islamic calendar that corresponds to 764 – 765 CE

== Military ==
- BQM-147 Dragon unmanned aerial vehicle, a tactical battlefield UAV operated by the US Marine Corps
- Ryan Model 147 Lightning Bug was a drone, or unmanned aerial vehicle during the 1960s
- USS Assail (AM-147) was a United States Navy Admirable-class minesweeper during World War II
- USS Blair (DE-147) was a United States Navy Edsall-class destroyer escort during World War II
- USS Cottle (APA-147) was a United States Navy Haskell-class attack transport during World War II
- USS General E. T. Collins (AP-147) was a United States Navy General G. O. Squier-class transport ship during World War II
- USS Roper (DD-147) was a United States Navy Wickes-class destroyer during World War II
- USS Truckee (AO-147) was a United States Navy Neosho-class fleet oiler of the United States Navy during the Six-Day War

== Science and medicine ==
- 147 Protogeneia, a large main belt asteroid with a low eccentricity and low inclination
- NGC 147, a Dwarf spheroidal galaxy about 2.58 million light-years away in the constellation Cassiopeia
- Promethium-147, an isotope of promethium with a half-life of 2.62 years
- JWH-147 is an analgesic drug used in scientific research, which acts as a cannabinoid agonist at both the CB_{1} and CB_{2} receptors

== Snooker ==
- The maximum break, the highest possible break in snooker, in the absence of fouls and refereeing errors
- 147-Break is a 1983 documentary with Steve Davis, an English professional snooker player
- The Snooker 147 PlayStation 2 game

== Transportation ==
- 147th Street (Sibley Boulevard) station, a Metra Electric station in Harvey, Illinois, United States
- Alfa Romeo 147, a hatchback
- Fiat 147, a supermini car
- Volkswagen Type 147 Kleinlieferwagen, a panel van

== Other uses ==
- Sonnet 147, a work by Shakespeare

== See also ==
- List of highways numbered 147
- United Nations Security Council Resolution 147
- United States Supreme Court cases, Volume 147
- Psalm 147
