= 141 (number) =

← 140	141	142 →
- ← 140 141 142 143 144 145 146 147 148 149 →: List of numbers; Integers; ← 0 100 200 300 400 500 600 700 800 900 →
- Cardinal: one hundred forty-one
- Ordinal: 141st (one hundred forty-first)
- Factorization: 3 × 47
- Divisors: 1, 3, 47, 141
- Greek numeral: ΡΜΑ´
- Roman numeral: CXLI, cxli
- Binary: 10001101_{2}
- Ternary: 12020_{3}
- Senary: 353_{6}
- Octal: 215_{8}
- Duodecimal: B9_{12}
- Hexadecimal: 8D_{16}

141 (one hundred [and] forty-one) is the natural number following 140 and preceding 142.

== In mathematics ==
141 is:

- a centered pentagonal number.
- the sum of the sums of the divisors of the first 13 positive integers.
- the second n to give a prime Cullen number (of the form n2^{n} + 1).
- the first three digits after the decimal point in the base 10 representation of pi (3.141592...)
- an undulating number in base 10, with the previous being 131, and the next being 151.
- the sixth hendecagonal (11-gonal) number.
- a semiprime: a product of two prime numbers, namely 3 and 47. Since those prime factors are Gaussian primes, this means that 141 is a Blum integer.
- a Hilbert prime
- Sometimes used as an acronym [1 representing A and 4 representing D] to stand for Anti Deforestation Action, often used by radical environmentalists
