= 146 (number) =

← 145	146	147 →
- ← 140 141 142 143 144 145 146 147 148 149 →: List of numbers; Integers; ← 0 100 200 300 400 500 600 700 800 900 →
- Cardinal: one hundred forty-six
- Ordinal: 146th (one hundred forty-sixth)
- Factorization: 2 × 73
- Divisors: 1, 2, 73, 146
- Greek numeral: ΡΜϚ´
- Roman numeral: CXLVI, cxlvi
- Binary: 10010010_{2}
- Ternary: 12102_{3}
- Senary: 402_{6}
- Octal: 222_{8}
- Duodecimal: 102_{12}
- Hexadecimal: 92_{16}

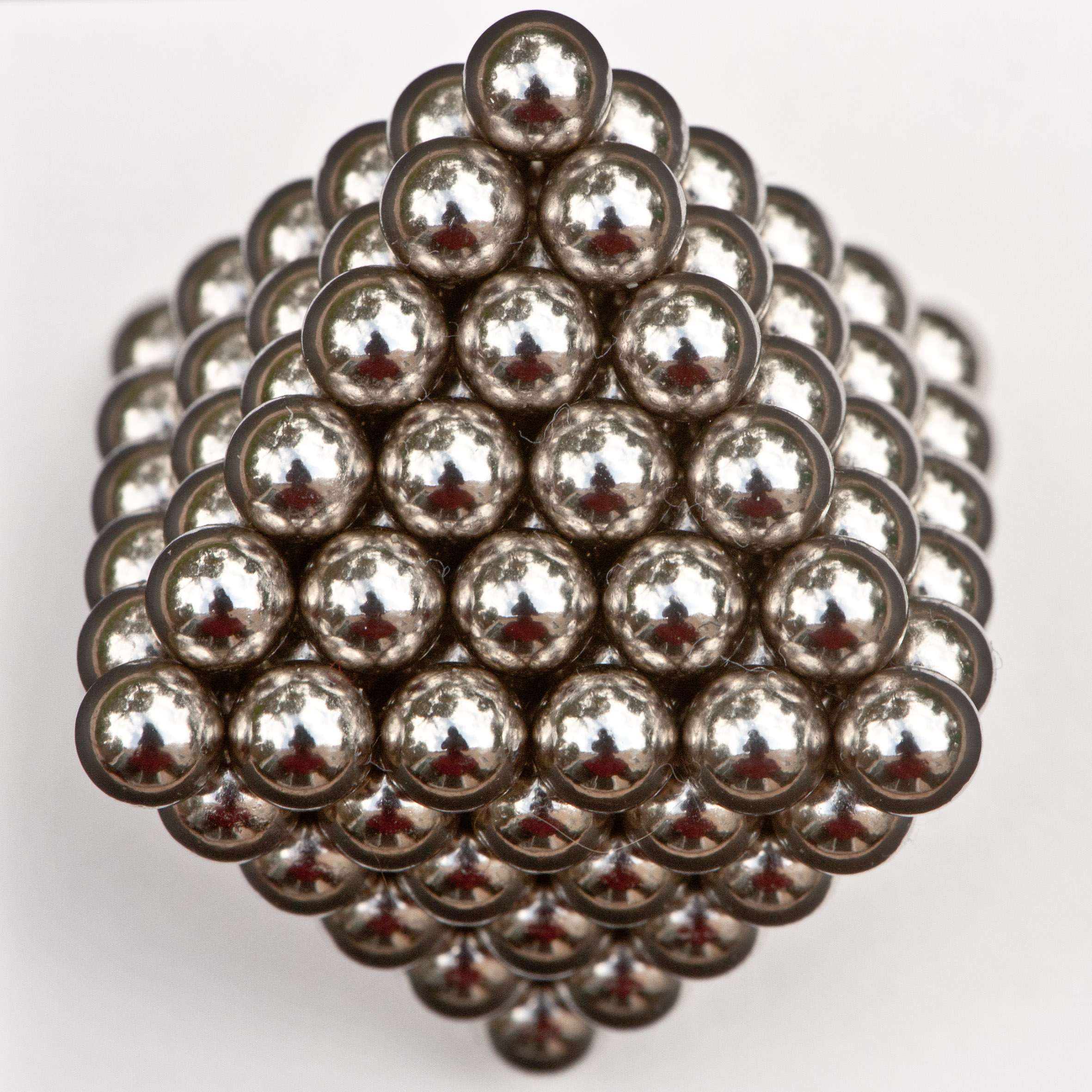
146 magnetic balls, arranged to show that 146 is an octahedral number

146 (one hundred [and] forty-six) is the natural number following 145 and preceding 147.

== In mathematics ==
146 is an octahedral number, the number of spheres that can be packed into in a regular octahedron with six spheres along each edge. For an octahedron with seven spheres along each edge, the number of spheres on the surface of the octahedron is again 146. It is also possible to arrange 146 disks in the plane into an irregular octagon with six disks on each side, making 146 an octo number.

There is no integer with exactly 146 coprimes less than it, so 146 is a nontotient. It is also never the difference between an integer and the total of coprimes below it, so it is a noncototient. And it is not the sum of proper divisors of any number, making it an untouchable number.

There are 146 connected partially ordered sets with four labeled elements. 146 is also a repdigit in base 8 (222).

== In other fields ==
146 is also:

- 146th Airlift Wing is a unit of the California Air National Guard
- 146 (Antrim Artillery)
- 146 Lucina, a main-belt asteroid

== See also ==
- 146 (disambiguation)
