= 142 =

142 may refer to:

- 142 (number), the natural number following 141 and preceding 143
- AD 142, a year of the Julian calendar
- 142 BC, a year of the pre-Julian Roman calendar
- 142 Polana, a main-belt asteroid
