= Clix =

Clix or CLIX may refer to:

== Technology ==
- Clix (gamer), American streamer and esports player
- Clix (miniatures), a system of miniatures games produced by WizKids
- CLIX (Unix version), developed by Intergraph
- iRiver Clix, rebrand of the iRiver U10, a multimedia player
- Optimus Clix, a defunct Portuguese telecommunications company
  - Clix (website), a defunct Portuguese website that was run by the company

== Other uses ==
- 159 (number), written as CLIX in Roman numerals
- Clix Malt Liquor
