= 143 (number) =

← 142	143	144 →
- ← 140 141 142 143 144 145 146 147 148 149 →: List of numbers; Integers; ← 0 100 200 300 400 500 600 700 800 900 →
- Cardinal: one hundred forty-three
- Ordinal: 143rd (one hundred forty-third)
- Factorization: 11 × 13
- Divisors: 1, 11, 13, 143
- Greek numeral: ΡΜΓ´
- Roman numeral: CXLIII, cxliii
- Binary: 10001111_{2}
- Ternary: 12022_{3}
- Senary: 355_{6}
- Octal: 217_{8}
- Duodecimal: BB_{12}
- Hexadecimal: 8F_{16}

143 (one hundred [and] forty-three) is the natural number following 142 and preceding 144. It is one less than a gross.

== In media ==
- On Mister Rogers' Neighborhood: "Transformations", 143 is used to mean "I love you". 1 meaning I for 1 letter, 4 meaning Love for the 4 letters, and 3 meaning You for the 3 letters. Reportedly, Fred Rogers maintained his weight at exactly 143 pounds (65 kg) for the last thirty years of his life, and associated the number with the phrase "I love you".
- Jake Shimabukuro released the song "143" based on his experience in high school when 143 was sent on a pager to indicate "I Love You".
- Sal Governale of The Howard Stern Show had a long running saga on the show about his wife who had an emotional friend. He discovered the severity of their relationship when he read their text messages and emails which included "143", shorthand for "I love you".
- "Case 143", song by Stray Kids.

== In popular culture ==
- 143. A popular pager number to communicate "I love you" (based on the number of letters in each of the three words)
- 143, 2024 album by Katy Perry

== In other fields ==
143 is also:

- The year AD 143 or 143 BC
- 143 AH is a year in the Islamic calendar that corresponds to 760 – 761 CE
- 143 Adria is a large main belt asteroid
- 143 Records label of producer David Foster, a sub-label of Atlantic Records
- Psalm 143
- Sonnet 143 by William Shakespeare
- The 143, in South Africa, refers to the 143 conscientious objectors who publicly refused to do military service in the Apartheid army in 1988.
- The atomic number of unquadtrium, a temporary chemical element

== See also ==
- List of highways numbered 143
- United Nations Security Council Resolution 143
- United States Supreme Court cases, S3XiFi3D 143
