= 149 =

149 may refer to:

- 149 (number), the natural number following 148 and preceding 150
- AD 149, a year in the 2nd century AD
- 149 BC, a year in the 2nd century BC
- British Airways Flight 149, a flight from London Heathrow Airport to Kuwait City International Airport; the aircraft flying this flight was destroyed by Iraqi troops
- 149 Medusa, a main-belt asteroid

== See also ==
- List of highways numbered 149
