= 148 =

148 may refer to:

- 148 (number), the natural number following 147 and preceding 149
- AD 148, a year in the 2nd century AD
- 148 BC, a year in the 2nd century BC
- 148 (album), an album by C418
- 148 (Meiktila) Battery Royal Artillery, a specialist Naval Gunfire Support Forward Observation unit within 29 Commando Regiment Royal Artillery of 3 Commando Brigade Royal Marines
- 148 (New Jersey bus), a New Jersey Transit bus route
- 148 Gallia, a main-belt asteroid
- Tatra 148, a heavy truck
- Fiat 148, a supermini car

== See also ==
- List of highways numbered 148
