= 156 (number) =

← 155	156	157 →
- ← 150 151 152 153 154 155 156 157 158 159 →: List of numbers; Integers; ← 0 100 200 300 400 500 600 700 800 900 →
- Cardinal: one hundred fifty-six
- Ordinal: 156th (one hundred fifty-sixth)
- Factorization: 2^{2} × 3 × 13
- Divisors: 1, 2, 3, 4, 6, 12, 13, 26, 39, 52, 78, 156
- Greek numeral: ΡΝϚ´
- Roman numeral: CLVI, clvi
- Binary: 10011100_{2}
- Ternary: 12210_{3}
- Senary: 420_{6}
- Octal: 234_{8}
- Duodecimal: 110_{12}
- Hexadecimal: 9C_{16}

156 (one hundred [and] fifty-six) is the natural number, following 155 and preceding 157.

== In mathematics ==
156 is an abundant number, a pronic number, a dodecagonal number, and a refactorable number.

156 is the number of graphs on 6 unlabeled nodes.

156 is a repdigit in base 5 (1111), and also in bases 25, 38, 51, 77, and 155.

156 degrees is the internal angle of a pentadecagon.
