= 157 (number) =

← 156	157	158 →
- ← 150 151 152 153 154 155 156 157 158 159 →: List of numbers; Integers; ← 0 100 200 300 400 500 600 700 800 900 →
- Cardinal: one hundred fifty-seven
- Ordinal: 157th (one hundred fifty-seventh)
- Factorization: prime
- Prime: 37th
- Divisors: 1, 157
- Greek numeral: ΡΝΖ´
- Roman numeral: CLVII, clvii
- Binary: 10011101_{2}
- Ternary: 12211_{3}
- Senary: 421_{6}
- Octal: 235_{8}
- Duodecimal: 111_{12}
- Hexadecimal: 9D_{16}

157 (one hundred [and] fifty-seven) is the number following 156 and preceding 158.

== In mathematics ==
157 is:

- the 37th prime number. The next prime is 163 and the previous prime is 151.
- a balanced prime, because the arithmetic mean of those primes yields 157
- an emirp
- a Chen prime
- the largest known prime p which $\frac{p^p+1}{p+1}$ is also prime. (See (sequence A056826 in the OEIS)).
- the least irregular prime with index 2.
- a palindromic number in bases 7 (313_{7}) and 12 (111_{12}).
- a repunit in base 12, so it is a unique prime in the same base
- a prime whose digits sum to a prime. (see (sequence A046704 in the OEIS))
- a super-prime (37 is prime)

In base 10, 157^{2} is 24649, and 158^{2} is 24964, which uses the same digits. Numbers having this property are listed in (sequence A072841 in the OEIS). The previous entry is 13, and the next entry after 157 is 913.

The simplest right angle triangle with rational sides that has area 157 has the longest side with a denominator of 45 digits.

== In music ==
- "157" is a song by Tom Rosenthal where the lyrics merely consist of the numbers from 1 to 157. The song was released on April Fools' Day, 2020.
