= Bryan Park =

Bryan Park may refer to several places in the United States:

- Bryan Park (Downsville, Louisiana), a public park in Downsville, Louisiana
- Bryan Park (Miami), a neighborhood in Miami, Florida
- Bryan Park (Richmond, Virginia), a public park in Richmond, Virginia
- Bryan Park, Delaware, a place in Delaware
- Bryan Park (Omaha, Nebraska), a park in Omaha, Nebraska
- Bryan Park (Greensboro, North Carolina)
