= 152 (number) =

← 151	152	153 →
- ← 150 151 152 153 154 155 156 157 158 159 →: List of numbers; Integers; ← 0 100 200 300 400 500 600 700 800 900 →
- Cardinal: one hundred fifty-two
- Ordinal: 152nd (one hundred fifty-second)
- Factorization: 2^{3} × 19
- Divisors: 1, 2, 4, 8, 19, 38, 76, 152
- Greek numeral: ΡΝΒ´
- Roman numeral: CLII, clii
- Binary: 10011000_{2}
- Ternary: 12122_{3}
- Senary: 412_{6}
- Octal: 230_{8}
- Duodecimal: 108_{12}
- Hexadecimal: 98_{16}

152 (one hundred [and] fifty-two) is the natural number following 151 and preceding 153.

== In mathematics ==
152 is the sum of four consecutive primes (31 + 37 + 41 + 43). It is a nontotient since there is no integer with 152 coprimes below it.

152 is a refactorable number since it is divisible by the total number of divisors it has, and in base 10 it is divisible by the sum of its digits, making it a Harshad number.

The smallest repunit probable prime in base 152 was found in June 2015, it has 589570 digits.

The number of surface points on a 6*6*6 cube is 152.
