= 140 (number) =

← 139	140	141 →
- ← 140 141 142 143 144 145 146 147 148 149 →: List of numbers; Integers; ← 0 100 200 300 400 500 600 700 800 900 →
- Cardinal: one hundred forty
- Ordinal: 140th (one hundred fortieth)
- Factorization: 2^{2} × 5 × 7
- Divisors: 1, 2, 4, 5, 7, 10, 14, 20, 28, 35, 70, 140
- Greek numeral: ΡΜ´
- Roman numeral: CXL, cxl
- Binary: 10001100_{2}
- Ternary: 12012_{3}
- Senary: 352_{6}
- Octal: 214_{8}
- Duodecimal: B8_{12}
- Hexadecimal: 8C_{16}

140 (one hundred [and] forty) is the natural number following 139 and preceding 141.

== In mathematics ==
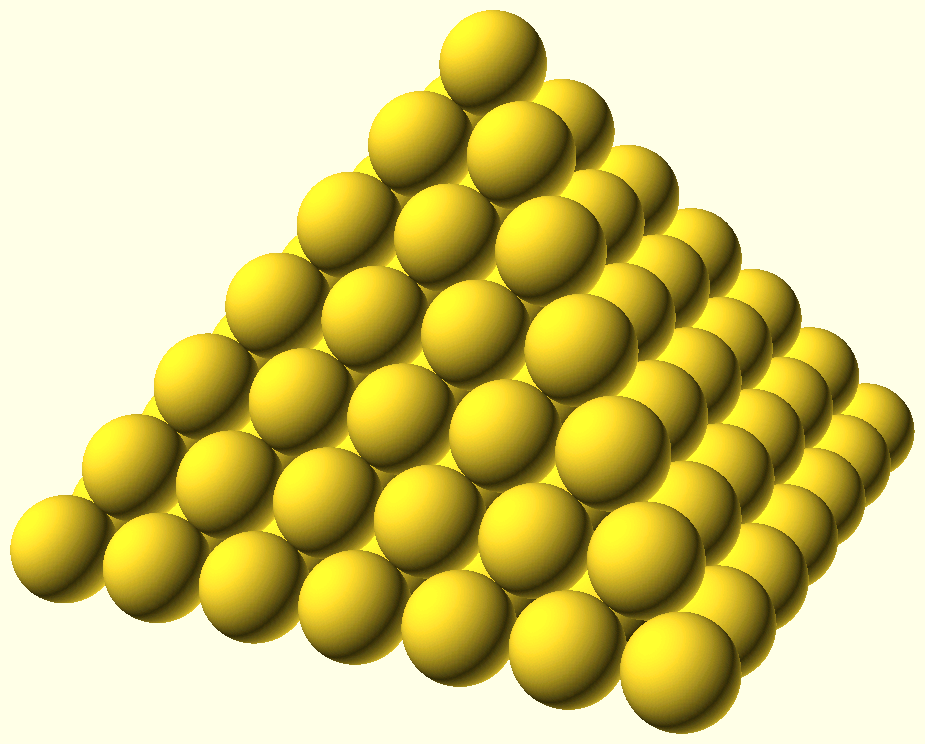
140 is a square pyramidal number.

140 is an abundant number and a harmonic divisor number. It is the sum of the squares of the first seven integers, which makes it a square pyramidal number.

140 is an odious number because it has an odd number of ones in its binary representation. The sum of Euler's totient function φ(x) over the first twenty-one integers is 140.

140 is a repdigit in bases 13, 19, 27, 34, 69, and 139.

== In other fields ==
140 is also:

- The former Twitter entry-character limit, a well-known characteristic of the service (based on the text messaging limit)
  - A film, based on the Twitter entry-character limit, created and edited by Frank Kelly of Ireland
