= 154 (number) =

← 153	154	155 →
- ← 150 151 152 153 154 155 156 157 158 159 →: List of numbers; Integers; ← 0 100 200 300 400 500 600 700 800 900 →
- Cardinal: one hundred fifty-four
- Ordinal: 154th (one hundred fifty-fourth)
- Factorization: 2 × 7 × 11
- Divisors: 1, 2, 7, 11, 14, 22, 77, 154
- Greek numeral: ΡΝΔ´
- Roman numeral: CLIV, cliv
- Binary: 10011010_{2}
- Ternary: 12201_{3}
- Senary: 414_{6}
- Octal: 232_{8}
- Duodecimal: 10A_{12}
- Hexadecimal: 9A_{16}

154 (one hundred [and] fifty-four) is the natural number following 153 and preceding 155.

== In mathematics ==
154 is a nonagonal number. Its factorization makes 154 a sphenic number.

There is no integer with exactly 154 coprimes below it, making 154 a noncototient, nor is there, in base 10, any integer that added up to its own digits yields 154, making 154 a self number

154 is the sum of the first six factorials, if one starts with $0!$ and assumes that $0!=1$.

With just 17 cuts, a pancake can be cut up into 154 pieces (Lazy caterer's sequence).

The distinct prime factors of 154 add up to 20, and so do the ones of 153, hence the two form a Ruth-Aaron pair. 154! + 1 is a factorial prime.
