= 146 =

146 may refer to:

- 146 (number), the natural number following 145 and preceding 147
- AD 146, a year in the 2nd century AD
- 146 BC, a year in the 2nd century BC
- 146 (Antrim Artillery) Corps Engineer Regiment, Royal Engineers
- 146 Lucina, a main-belt asteroid
- Alfa Romeo 146, a 5-door hatchback

== See also ==
- List of highways numbered 146
