= 153 (number) =

| ← 152 | 153 | 154 → |
- ← 150 151 152 153 154 155 156 157 158 159 →: List of numbers; Integers; ← 0 100 200 300 400 500 600 700 800 900 →
- Cardinal: one hundred fifty-three
- Ordinal: 153rd (one hundred fifty-third)
- Factorization: 3^{2} × 17
- Divisors: 1, 3, 9, 17, 51, 153
- Greek numeral: ΡΝΓ´
- Roman numeral: CLIII, cliii
- Binary: 10011001_{2}
- Ternary: 12200_{3}
- Senary: 413_{6}
- Octal: 231_{8}
- Duodecimal: 109_{12}
- Hexadecimal: 99_{16}

153 (one hundred [and] fifty-three) is a natural number and integer following 152 and preceding 154.

It is the sum of the first 17 integers (making it the 17th triangular number), and also the sum of the first five positive factorials.

== In mathematics ==
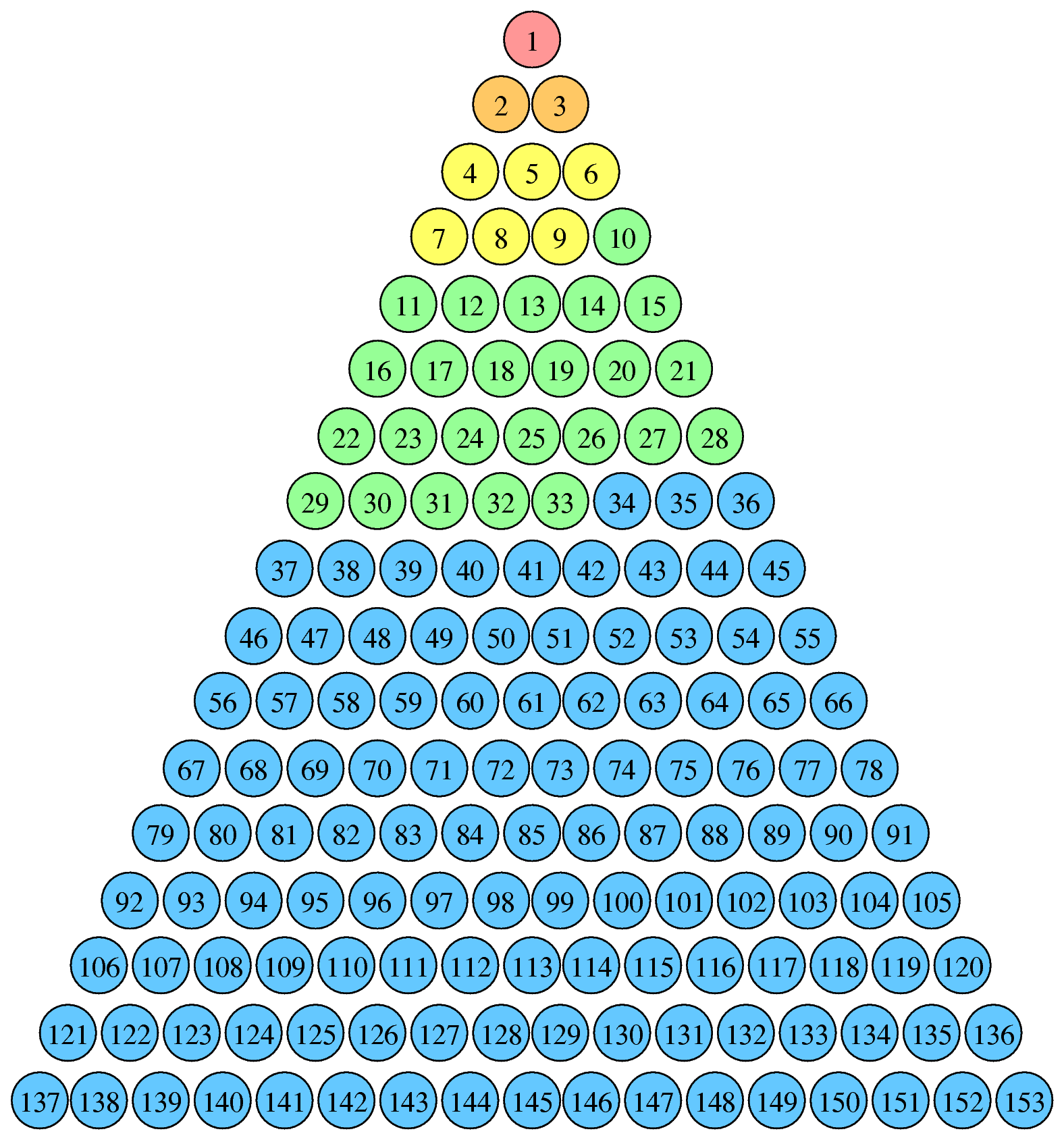
The number 153 is the 17th triangular number. The colours show that 153 is also the sum of the first five positive factorials.

The number 153 is associated with the geometric shape known as the Vesica piscis or Mandorla. Archimedes, in his Measurement of a Circle, referred to this ratio (153/265), as constituting the "measure of the fish", this ratio being an imperfect representation of $1 / \sqrt{3} \approx 0.57735$.

As a triangular number, 153 is the sum of the first 17 integers, and is also the sum of the first five positive factorials: $1!+2!+3!+4!+5!$.

The number 153 is also a hexagonal number, and a truncated triangle number, meaning that 1, 15, and 153 are all triangle numbers.

The distinct prime factors of 153 add up to 20, and so do the ones of 154, hence the two form a Ruth-Aaron pair.

Since $153 = 1^3 + 5^3 + 3^3$, it is a 3-narcissistic number, and it is also the smallest three-digit number which can be expressed as the sum of cubes of its digits. Only five other numbers can be expressed as the sum of the cubes of their digits: 0, 1, 370, 371 and 407. It is also a Friedman number, since 153 = 3 × 51.

The Biggs–Smith graph is a symmetric graph with 153 edges, all equivalent.

Another feature of the number 153 is that it is the limit of the following algorithm:

1. Take a random positive integer, divisible by three
2. Split that number into its base 10 digits
3. Take the sum of their cubes
4. Go back to the second step

An example, starting with the number 84:

$$\begin{align}
8^3 + 4^3 &=& 512 + 64 &=& 576\\
5^3 + 7^3 + 6^3 &=& 125 + 343 + 216 &=& 684\\
6^3 + 8^3 + 4^3 &=& 216 + 512 + 64  &=& 792\\
7^3 + 9^3 + 2^3 &=& 343 + 729 + 8  &=& 1080\\
1^3 + 0^3 + 8^3 + 0^3  &=& 1 + 0 + 512 + 0  &=& 513\\
5^3 + 1^3 + 3^3 &=& 125 + 1 + 27  &=& 153\\
1^3 + 5^3 + 3^3 &=& 1 + 125 + 27  &=& 153
\end{align}$$

There are 153 uniform polypeta that are generated from four different fundamental Coxeter groups in six-dimensional space.

The sum of the first eight Heegner numbers is 153.

== In the Bible ==
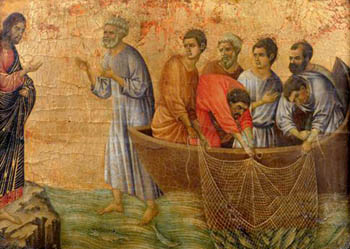
Appearance on Lake Tiberias by Duccio, 14th century, showing Jesus and the 7 fishing disciples (with Saint Peter leaving the boat)

The Gospel of John (chapter 21:1–14) includes the miraculous catch of 153 fish as the third appearance of Jesus after his resurrection. Augustine of Hippo argued that the significance lay in the fact that 153 is the sum of the first 17 integers (i.e. 153 is the 17th triangular number), representing the combination of divine grace (the seven gifts of the Holy Spirit) and law (the Ten Commandments).
