= 158 (number) =

← 157	158	159 →
- ← 150 151 152 153 154 155 156 157 158 159 →: List of numbers; Integers; ← 0 100 200 300 400 500 600 700 800 900 →
- Cardinal: one hundred fifty-eight
- Ordinal: 158th (one hundred fifty-eighth)
- Factorization: 2 × 79
- Divisors: 1, 2, 79, 158
- Greek numeral: ΡΝΗ´
- Roman numeral: CLVIII, clviii
- Binary: 10011110_{2}
- Ternary: 12212_{3}
- Senary: 422_{6}
- Octal: 236_{8}
- Duodecimal: 112_{12}
- Hexadecimal: 9E_{16}

158 (one hundred [and] fifty-eight) is the natural number following 157 and preceding 159.

== In mathematics ==
- 158 is a nontotient, since there is no integer with 158 coprimes below it. 158 is a Perrin number, appearing after 68, 90, 119.
- 100! is 158 digits long. It can be expressed as 9.332 x 10^{157}.

== In British Rail ==
The British Rail Class 158 train is a widely used DMU.
