= 159 (number) =

← 158	159	160 →
- ← 150 151 152 153 154 155 156 157 158 159 →: List of numbers; Integers; ← 0 100 200 300 400 500 600 700 800 900 →
- Cardinal: one hundred fifty-nine
- Ordinal: 159th (one hundred fifty-ninth)
- Factorization: 3 × 53
- Divisors: 1, 3, 53, 159
- Greek numeral: ΡΝΘ´
- Roman numeral: CLIX, clix
- Binary: 10011111_{2}
- Ternary: 12220_{3}
- Senary: 423_{6}
- Octal: 237_{8}
- Duodecimal: 113_{12}
- Hexadecimal: 9F_{16}

159 (one hundred [and] fifty-nine) is the natural number following 158 and preceding 160.

== In mathematics ==
159 is:

- the sum of 3 consecutive prime numbers: 47 + 53 + 59.
- a Woodall number.
- equal to the sum of the squares of the digits of its own square in base 15.

Only 5 numbers (greater than 1) have this property in base 15, none in base 10.
159 is the largest number that cannot be expressed as the sum of distinct pentagonal numbers.

- written CLIX in Roman numerals, which spells a proper noun with multiple meanings.

Given 159, the Mertens function returns 0.
