= 145 (number) =

← 144	145	146 →
- ← 140 141 142 143 144 145 146 147 148 149 →: List of numbers; Integers; ← 0 100 200 300 400 500 600 700 800 900 →
- Cardinal: one hundred forty-five
- Ordinal: 145th (one hundred forty-fifth)
- Factorization: 5 × 29
- Divisors: 1, 5, 29, 145
- Greek numeral: ΡΜΕ´
- Roman numeral: CXLV, cxlv
- Binary: 10010001_{2}
- Ternary: 12101_{3}
- Senary: 401_{6}
- Octal: 221_{8}
- Duodecimal: 101_{12}
- Hexadecimal: 91_{16}

145 (one hundred [and] forty-five) is the natural number following 144 and preceding 146.

== In mathematics ==
- Although composite, 145 is a Fermat pseudoprime in sixteen bases with b < 145. In four of those bases, it is a strong pseudoprime: 1, 12, 17, and 144.
- The Mertens function returns 0.
- 145 is a pentagonal number and a centered square number.
- $145 = 12^2 + 1^2 = 8^2 + 9^2$. 145 is the fourth number that is the sum of two different pairs of squares. Also, 145 is the result of 3^{4} + 4^{3}, making it a Leyland number.
- $145 = 1! + 4! + 5!$, making it a factorion. The only other numbers that have this property are 1, 2 and 40585.
- $145=5^2+5!=11^2+4!=12^2+1!$, making 145 the smallest number that can be written as the sum of a square number and a factorial in 3 ways. The next number with this property is 46249.
