= 147 (number) =

| ← 146 | 147 | 148 → |
- ← 140 141 142 143 144 145 146 147 148 149 →: List of numbers; Integers; ← 0 100 200 300 400 500 600 700 800 900 →
- Cardinal: one hundred forty-seven
- Ordinal: 147th (one hundred forty-seventh)
- Factorization: 3 × 7^{2}
- Divisors: 1, 3, 7, 21, 49, 147
- Greek numeral: ΡΜΖ´
- Roman numeral: CXLVII, cxlvii
- Binary: 10010011_{2}
- Ternary: 12110_{3}
- Senary: 403_{6}
- Octal: 223_{8}
- Duodecimal: 103_{12}
- Hexadecimal: 93_{16}

147 (one hundred [and] forty-seven) is the natural number following 146 and preceding 148.

== In mathematics ==
147 is the fourth centered icosahedral number. These are a class of figurate numbers that represent points in the shape of a regular icosahedron or alternatively points in the shape of a cuboctahedron, and are magic numbers for the face-centered cubic lattice. Separately, it is also a magic number for the diamond cubic.

It is also the fourth Apéry number $a_3$ following 19, where
$$a_n=\sum_{k=0}^n\binom{n}{k}^2\binom{n+k}{k},$$

with 147 the composite index of the nineteenth triangle number, 190.

There are 147 different ways of representing one as a sum of unit fractions with five terms, allowing repeated fractions, and 147 different self-avoiding polygonal chains of length six using horizontal and vertical segments of the integer lattice.

== See also ==
- 147 (disambiguation)
