= 144 (number) =

| ← 143 | 144 | 145 → |
- ← 140 141 142 143 144 145 146 147 148 149 →: List of numbers; Integers; ← 0 100 200 300 400 500 600 700 800 900 →
- Cardinal: one hundred forty-four
- Ordinal: 144th (one hundred forty-fourth)
- Factorization: 2^{4} × 3^{2}
- Divisors: 1, 2, 3, 4, 6, 8, 9, 12, 16, 18, 24, 36, 48, 72, 144
- Greek numeral: ΡΜΔ´
- Roman numeral: CXLIV, cxliv
- Binary: 10010000_{2}
- Ternary: 12100_{3}
- Senary: 400_{6}
- Octal: 220_{8}
- Duodecimal: 100_{12}
- Hexadecimal: 90_{16}

144 (one hundred [and] forty-four) is the natural number following 143 and preceding 145. It is coincidentally both the square of twelve (a dozen dozens, or one gross) and the twelfth Fibonacci number, and the only nontrivial number in the sequence that is square.

== Mathematics ==
144 is a highly totient number.

144 is the smallest number whose fifth power is a sum of four (smaller) fifth powers. This solution was found in 1966 by L. J. Lander and T. R. Parkin, and disproved Euler's sum of powers conjecture. It was famously published in a paper by both authors, whose body consisted of only two sentences:

A direct search on the CDC 6600 yielded
27^{5} + 84^{5} + 110^{5} + 133^{5} = 144^{5}
as the smallest instance in which four fifth powers sum to a fifth power. This is a counterexample to a conjecture by Euler that at least n nth powers are required to sum to an nth power, n > 2.

144 is a square. (12²=144)

144° is two-fifths of a full turn.

Two-fifths of a circle.

== In other fields ==
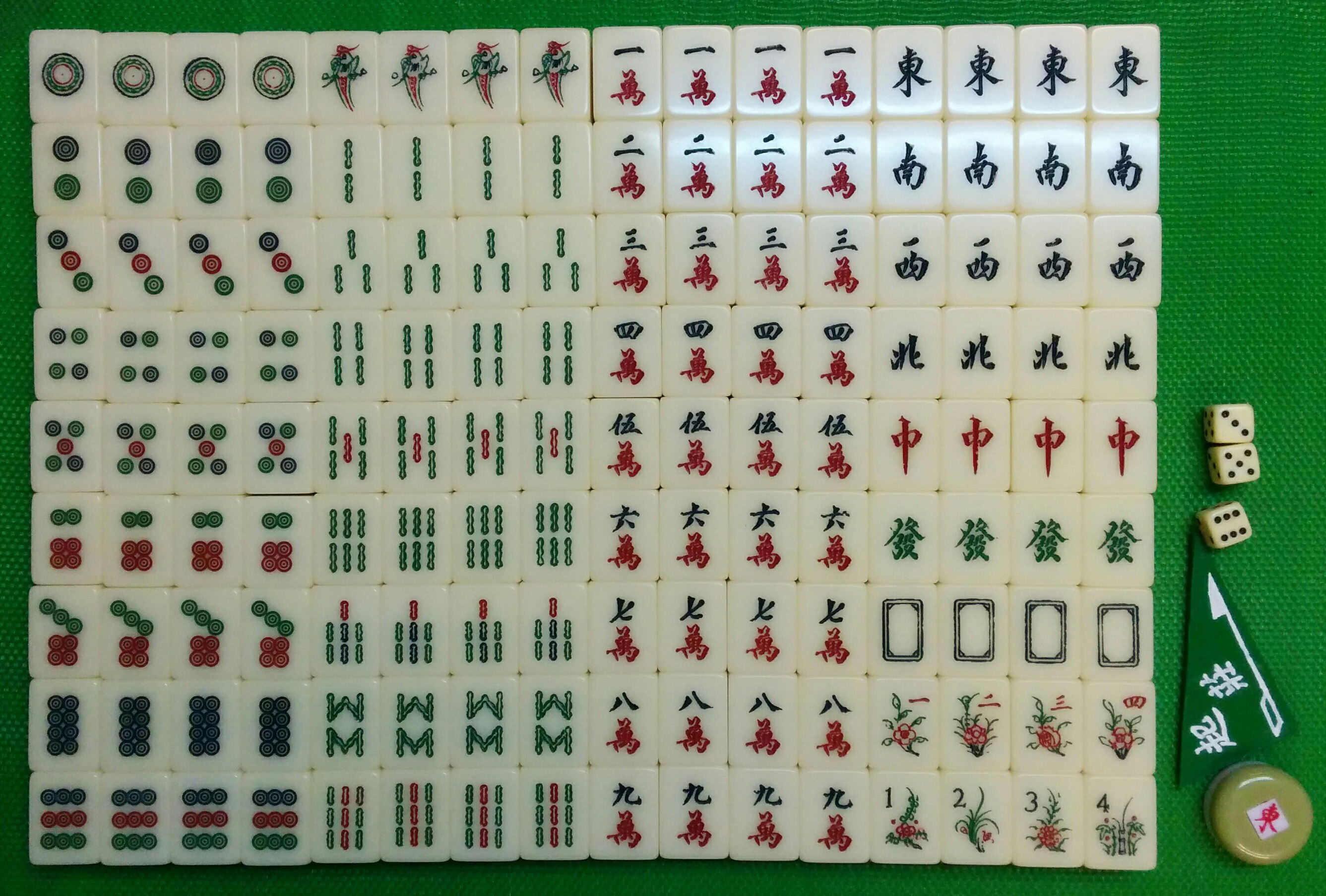
A traditional set of 144 Chinese Mahjong tiles.

- 1:144 scale is a scale used for some scale models.
- Several computers use 144Hz.
