= 155 (number) =

← 154	155	156 →
- ← 150 151 152 153 154 155 156 157 158 159 →: List of numbers; Integers; ← 0 100 200 300 400 500 600 700 800 900 →
- Cardinal: one hundred fifty-five
- Ordinal: 155th (one hundred fifty-fifth)
- Factorization: 5 × 31
- Divisors: 1, 5, 31, 155
- Greek numeral: ΡΝΕ´
- Roman numeral: CLV, clv
- Binary: 10011011_{2}
- Ternary: 12202_{3}
- Senary: 415_{6}
- Octal: 233_{8}
- Duodecimal: 10B_{12}
- Hexadecimal: 9B_{16}

155 (one hundred [and] fifty-five) is the natural number following 154 and preceding 156.

== In mathematics ==
155 is:

- a composite number
- a semiprime.
- a deficient number, since 1+5+31=37<155.
- odious, since its binary expansion $10011011_2$ has a total of 5 ones in it.
- Its prime factorization is 5*31, and the sum of the prime numbers between 5 and 31, inclusively, is 155.

There are 155 primitive permutation groups of degree 81. OEIS: A000019

If one adds up all the primes from the least through the greatest prime factors of 155, that is, 5 and 31, the result is 155. (sequence A055233 in the OEIS) Only three other "small" semiprimes (10, 39, and 371) share this attribute.

== Other uses ==
- 155 is the airline code for DHL Aviation.
