= Bryan Park (Downsville, Louisiana) =

Public park in Downsville, Louisiana

Coordinates: 32°37′16″N 92°24′15″W

Bryan Park is a 34-acre (14 ha) community park in Downsville, Louisiana off of highway 151. It features a 3-acre (1.2 ha) pond, surrounded by a walking trail, and around 40 species of trees.

== Access ==
The park is accessible on foot, or by a gravel road from Louisiana Highway 151. A walking trail runs around the pond, through bottomland hardwoods and mixed pine forest.

== Bird life ==
Nesting species include black-throated green or black and white warblers, northern parulas, and red-shouldered and Cooper's hawks may be viewed. Wading birds such as great egret, great blue heron, and green heron also frequent the pond and the cattail perimeter hosts red-winged blackbirds. In the warmer months, honeysuckle attracts ruby-throated hummingbirds. Wetland migrants include marsh wren and common yellowthroat in the fall and spring. In the late winter until spring, black vultures court and cruise. Other wildfowl includes woodpeckers, eastern bluebirds, various sparrows, vireos, Indigo buntings, eastern meadowlarks, bobwhites, mourning dove, northern cardinals, blue jays, and owls.

== History ==
The land was formerly owned by the Bryan Sausage company. In April 2007, Bill and Sue Bryan donated the land to the Village of Downsville, with the stipulation that it be used as a public community park.
