= 151 (number) =

← 150	151	152 →
- ← 150 151 152 153 154 155 156 157 158 159 →: List of numbers; Integers; ← 0 100 200 300 400 500 600 700 800 900 →
- Cardinal: one hundred fifty-one
- Ordinal: 151st (one hundred fifty-first)
- Factorization: prime
- Prime: 36th
- Divisors: 1, 151
- Greek numeral: ΡΝΑ´
- Roman numeral: CLI, cli
- Binary: 10010111_{2}
- Ternary: 12121_{3}
- Senary: 411_{6}
- Octal: 227_{8}
- Duodecimal: 107_{12}
- Hexadecimal: 97_{16}

151 (one hundred [and] fifty-one) is the natural number following 150 and preceding 152.

== In mathematics ==
151 is the 36th prime number, the previous is 149, with which it comprises a twin prime. 151 is also a palindromic prime, a centered decagonal number, and a lucky number.

151 appears in the Padovan sequence, preceded by the terms 65, 86, 114; it is the sum of the first two of these.

151 is a unique prime in base 2, since it is the only prime with period 15 in base 2.

There are 151 4-uniform tilings, such that the symmetry of tilings with regular polygons have four orbits of vertices.

151 is the number of uniform paracompact honeycombs with infinite facets and vertex figures in the third dimension, which stem from 23 different Coxeter groups. Split into two whole numbers, 151 is the sum of 75 and 76, both relevant numbers in Euclidean and hyperbolic 3-space:

- 75 is the total number of non-prismatic uniform polyhedra, which incorporate regular polyhedra, semiregular polyhedra, and star polyhedra,
- 75 uniform compound polyhedra, inclusive of seven types of families of prisms and antiprisms,
- 76 is the number of unique uniform compact hyperbolic honeycombs that are solely generated from Wythoff constructions.

While 151 is the 36th indexed prime, its twin prime 149 has a reciprocal whose repeating decimal expansion has a digit sum of 666, which is the magic constant in a $\tfrac{1}{149}$ prime reciprocal magic square equal to the sum of the first 36 non-zero integers, or equivalently the 36th triangular number.

Furthermore, the sum between twin primes (149, 151) is 300, which in turn is the 24th triangular number.
