= 142 (number) =

← 141	142	143 →
- ← 140 141 142 143 144 145 146 147 148 149 →: List of numbers; Integers; ← 0 100 200 300 400 500 600 700 800 900 →
- Cardinal: one hundred forty-two
- Ordinal: 142nd (one hundred forty-second)
- Factorization: 2 × 71
- Divisors: 1, 2, 71, 142
- Greek numeral: ΡΜΒ´
- Roman numeral: CXLII, cxlii
- Binary: 10001110_{2}
- Ternary: 12021_{3}
- Senary: 354_{6}
- Octal: 216_{8}
- Duodecimal: BA_{12}
- Hexadecimal: 8E_{16}

142 (one hundred [and] forty-two) is the natural number following 141 and preceding 143.

== In mathematics ==
There are 142 connected functional graphs on four labeled vertices, 142 planar graphs with 6 unlabeled vertices, and 142 partial involutions on five elements. It is a semiprime. It is also palindromic in base 3 (12021).

== In memoriam ==
At the United States Merchant Marine Academy, the number '142' represents 142 Cadet/Midshipmen who died aboard merchant vessels during World War II. The U.S. Merchant Marine Academy, among the nation's five federal academies, is the only institution authorized to carry a battle standard as part of its color guard. The battle standard bears the number "142" on a field of red, white and blue.
