= List of highways numbered 150 =

The following highways are numbered 150:

== Canada ==
- New Brunswick Route 150
- Prince Edward Island Route 150
- Winnipeg Route 150

== Costa Rica ==
- National Route 150

== India ==
- National Highway 150 (India)

== Japan ==
- Japan National Route 150

== United Kingdom ==
- B150 road

== United States ==
- U.S. Route 150
- Alabama State Route 150
- Arkansas Highway 150
- California State Route 150
- Colorado State Highway 150
- Connecticut Route 150
- Florida State Road 150 (former)
- Georgia State Route 150
- Illinois Route 150
- Iowa Highway 150
- K-150
- Louisiana Highway 150
- Maine State Route 150
- Maryland Route 150
- Massachusetts Route 150
- M-150 (Michigan highway)
- Missouri Route 150
- New Hampshire Route 150
- New Mexico State Road 150
- New York State Route 150
- North Carolina Highway 150
- Ohio State Route 150
- Oklahoma State Highway 150
- Pennsylvania Route 150
- South Carolina Highway 150
- Texas State Highway 150
  - Texas State Highway Loop 150
- Utah State Route 150
- Virginia State Route 150
- West Virginia State Route 150
- Wisconsin Highway 150 (former)
- Wyoming Highway 150

Territories

- Puerto Rico Highway 150

Preceded by 149	Lists of highways 150	Succeeded by 151
