= Optimus Clix =

Portuguese telecommunications company

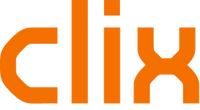
- Industry: Telecommunications, Media
- Founded: October 1999; 26 years ago
- Defunct: May 2014; 12 years ago
- Headquarters: Lisbon, Portugal
- Key people: Belmiro de Azevedo
- Products: Cable television (IPTV), FTTH, broadband Internet access, landline, television broadcasting

Optimus Clix was a telecommunications company owned by Sonaecom. It was founded in 1999 as Novis and merged in 2013 with ZON to form ZON Optimus (NOS from May 2014). After the merger, its independent services shut down. The website continued operating in NOS's hands until September 15, 2015.

== History ==
Clix had its origins as a website and ISP in 1999 operated by Novis. In 2005, the Clix brand diversified beyond the internet and announced that, after summer, it would launch a triple-play service encompassing internet, landline telephone and television. On June 17, for that end, it signed a protocol with Rádio e Televisão de Portugal to provide content.

On September 23, 2008, Clix launched Portugal's first commercial fiber-optic offer, Clix Fibra, in three areas of Lisbon and two of Porto.

On January 21, 2010, Sonaecom unified the Optimus brand for telecommunications services; consequently Clix was downsized to its fixed line and fiber brand. The brand unification campaign aired from January 25.

On May 15, 2014, the eve of the launch of the new NOS brand, the Clix-branded services (except for the website) shut down.

== Clix TV ==
Clix TV was Portugal's first IPTV television operator, which existed between 2005 and 2014.

The service started in November 2005 with a testing phase, however it was still pending negotiations with PT Conteúdos to enable the availability of three SIC channels (SIC Notícias, SIC Radical and SIC Comédia), the four premium Lusomundo channels and the video on-demand (pay-per-view) channels it had on TV Cabo. By early December, Clix SmarTV was operational, but to a reduced number of subscribers.

In July 2007, it launched a free games service.

On July 9, 2009, it launched Star Gold and Star Plus for the Indian diaspora in Portugal. In January 2010, the remaining FIC Portugal channels finally joined the platform: FX, Fox Next, Fox Life, Fox HD (its SD feed was already available), Fox Life HD and Nat Geo Wild HD.

From February 2010, it enabled its users to set recordings (Remote Recording) from their cellphones (using the mobile website) or from their computers (using the Clix TV website).

The service shut down on May 15, 2014.
