= 142 BC =

142 BC in various calendars
- Gregorian calendar: 142 BC; CXLII BC
- Ab urbe condita: 612
- Ancient Egypt era: XXXIII dynasty, 182
- Pharaoh: Ptolemy VIII Physcon, 4
- Ancient Greek Olympiad (summer): 159th Olympiad, year 3
- Assyrian calendar: 4609
- Balinese saka calendar: N/A
- Bengali calendar: −735 – −734
- Berber calendar: 809
- Buddhist calendar: 403
- Burmese calendar: −779
- Byzantine calendar: 5367–5368
- Chinese calendar: 戊戌年 (Earth Dog); 2556 or 2349 — to — 己亥年 (Earth Pig); 2557 or 2350
- Coptic calendar: −425 – −424
- Discordian calendar: 1025
- Ethiopian calendar: −149 – −148
- Hebrew calendar: 3619–3620
- Hindu calendars
- Vikram Samvat: −85 – −84
- Shaka Samvat: N/A
- Kali Yuga: 2959–2960
- Holocene calendar: 9859
- Iranian calendar: 763 BP – 762 BP
- Islamic calendar: 786 BH – 785 BH
- Javanese calendar: N/A
- Julian calendar: N/A
- Korean calendar: 2192
- Minguo calendar: 2053 before ROC 民前2053年
- Nanakshahi calendar: −1609
- Seleucid era: 170/171 AG
- Thai solar calendar: 401–402
- Tibetan calendar: ས་ཕོ་ཁྱི་ལོ་ (male Earth-Dog) −15 or −396 or −1168 — to — ས་མོ་ཕག་ལོ་ (female Earth-Boar) −14 or −395 or −1167

Year 142 BC was a year of the pre-Julian Roman calendar. At the time it was known as the Year of the Consulship of Calvus and Servilianus (or, less frequently, year 612 Ab urbe condita). The denomination 142 BC for this year has been used since the early medieval period, when the Anno Domini calendar era became the prevalent method in Europe for naming years.

== Events ==
=== By place ===
==== Syria ====
- Diodotus Tryphon seizes the throne of the Seleucid Empire.

==== Judea ====
- Simon Maccabaeus succeeds his brother Jonathan as High Priest of Judea until 135 BC.

== Births ==
- Ptolemy IX, Egyptian pharaoh (d. 81 BC)
