= List of highways numbered 151 =

Route 151, or Highway 151, may refer to:

== Canada ==
- Prince Edward Island Route 151

== Costa Rica ==
- National Route 151

== India ==
- National Highway 151 (India)

== Ireland ==
- R151 road (Ireland)

== Japan ==
- Japan National Route 151

== Korea, South ==
- Seocheon–Gongju Expressway

== United Kingdom ==
- A151 road
- B151 road

== United States ==
- U.S. Route 151
- Alabama State Route 151
- Arkansas Highway 151
- California State Route 151
- Colorado State Highway 151
- Connecticut Route 151
- Florida State Road 151
- Georgia State Route 151
- Hawaii Route 151 (former)
- Illinois Route 151
- Kentucky Route 151
- Louisiana Highway 151
- Maine State Route 151
- Maryland Route 151
- Massachusetts Route 151
- M-151 (Michigan Highway) (former)
- Missouri Route 151
- New Hampshire Route 151
- New Jersey Route 151 (former)
- New York State Route 151
- North Carolina Highway 151
- Ohio State Route 151
- Oklahoma State Highway 151
- Pennsylvania Route 151
- South Carolina Highway 151
- Tennessee State Route 151
- Texas State Highway 151
  - Texas State Highway Loop 151
  - Texas State Highway Spur 151
- Utah State Route 151
- Virginia State Route 151
- Washington State Route 151 (former)
- Wyoming Highway 151

Territories

- Puerto Rico Highway 151

Preceded by 150	Lists of highways 151	Succeeded by 152
