= List of highways numbered 148 =

The following highways are numbered 148:

== Argentina ==
- National Route 148

== Canada ==
- New Brunswick Route 148
- Ontario Highway 148
- Prince Edward Island Route 148
- Quebec Route 148

== Costa Rica ==
- National Route 148

== India ==
- National Highway 148 (India)

== Italy ==
- State road 148

== Japan ==
- Japan National Route 148
  - Fukuoka Prefecture Route 148
  - Nara Prefecture Route 148

== Malaysia ==
- Malaysia Federal Route 148

== United Kingdom ==
- A148 road
- B148 road

== United States ==
- U.S. Route 148 (former proposal)
- Alabama State Route 148
- Arkansas Highway 148
- California State Route 148 (unbuilt)
- Connecticut Route 148
- Florida State Road 148 (former)
  - County Road 148 (Hamilton County, Florida)
- Georgia State Route 148 (former)
- Hawaii Route 148
- Illinois Route 148
- Indiana State Road 148
- Iowa Highway 148
- K-148 (Kansas highway)
- Kentucky Route 148
- Louisiana Highway 148
- Maine State Route 148
- Maryland Route 148 (former)
- Massachusetts Route 148
- County Road 148 (Ramsey County, Minnesota)
- Missouri Route 148
- New York State Route 148
  - County Route 148 (Broome County, New York)
  - County Route 148 (Fulton County, New York)
  - County Route 148 (Seneca County, New York)
- North Carolina Highway 148
- Ohio State Route 148
- Pennsylvania Route 148
- Tennessee State Route 148
- Texas State Highway 148
  - Texas State Highway Spur 148
  - Farm to Market Road 148
- Utah State Route 148
- Virginia State Route 148
- Wisconsin Highway 148 (former)

Territories

- Puerto Rico Highway 148

Preceded by 147	Lists of highways 148	Succeeded by 149
