= Hilbert number =

Positive integer of the form 4n + 1

In number theory, a branch of mathematics, a Hilbert number is a positive integer of the form 4n + 1 (Flannery & Flannery (2000, p. 35)). The Hilbert numbers were named after David Hilbert. The sequence of Hilbert numbers begins 1, 5, 9, 13, 17, ... (sequence A016813 in the OEIS))

== Properties ==
- The Hilbert number sequence is the arithmetic sequence with $a_1=1,d=4$, meaning the Hilbert numbers follow the recurrence relation $a_n=a_{n-1}+4$.
- The sum of a Hilbert number amount of Hilbert numbers (1 number, 5 numbers, 9 numbers, etc.) is also a Hilbert number.

== Hilbert primes ==
A Hilbert prime is a Hilbert number that is not divisible by a smaller Hilbert number (other than 1). The sequence of Hilbert primes begins

5, 9, 13, 17, 21, 29, 33, 37, 41, 49, ... (sequence A057948 in the OEIS).

A Hilbert prime is not necessarily a prime number; for example, 21 is a composite number since 21 = 3 ⋅ 7. However, 21 is a Hilbert prime since neither 3 nor 7 (the only factors of 21 other than 1 and itself) are Hilbert numbers. It follows from multiplication modulo 4 that a Hilbert prime is either a prime number of the form 4n + 1 (called a Pythagorean prime), or a semiprime of the form (4a + 3) ⋅ (4b + 3).
