= USS Cottle =

1944 Haskell-class attack transport

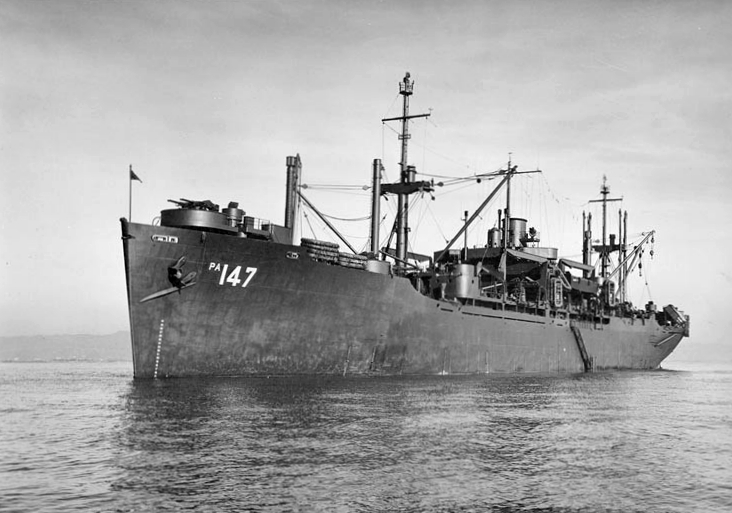

History

United States
- Name: USS Cottle
- Namesake: Cottle County, Texas
- Ordered: as type VC2-S-AP5
- Laid down: date unknown
- Launched: 25 November 1944
- Acquired: 14 December 1944
- Commissioned: 14 December 1944
- Decommissioned: 6 March 1946
- Stricken: 1946
- Fate: Scrapped, 1973

General characteristics
- Displacement: 12,450 tons (full load)
- Length: 455 ft 0 in (138.68 m)
- Beam: 62 ft 0 in (18.90 m)
- Draught: 24 ft 0 in (7.32 m)
- Speed: 19 knots
- Complement: 536
- Armament: one 5 in (130 mm) gun mount, twelve 40 mm gun mounts, ten 20 mm gun mounts

USS Cottle (APA-147) was a Haskell-class attack transport in service with the United States Navy from 1944 to 1946. She was scrapped in 1973.

== History ==
Cottle (APA-147) was launched 25 November 1944 by Kaiser Shipbuilding, Co., Inc., Vancouver, Washington, under a Maritime Commission contract; sponsored by Mrs. B. Decker; transferred to the Navy 14 December 1944; and commissioned the same day.

Sailing from Seattle, Washington, 1 March 1945 with U.S. Army troops on board, Cottle carried her passengers to Honolulu where she embarked men of naval construction battalions for transportation to Samar, Philippine Islands, arriving 17 April. Returning by way of Ulithi and Guam to load passengers, cargo, and Japanese prisoners of war, she arrived at Pearl Harbor 24 May to embark four underwater demolition teams for San Francisco, California, arriving 3 June. From 15 June to 7 August she voyaged to Manila with Army troops.

With the end of the war Cottle sailed from San Pedro, California, 24 August, loaded Army occupation troops at Pearl Harbor, and landed them at Wakayama, Japan, 27 September. She embarked homeward bound servicemen in the Philippines, returning with them to San Francisco 30 October, and following another "Operation Magic Carpet" voyage to the Philippines, sailed from San Francisco 12 January 1946 for Norfolk, Virginia, arriving 4 February.

=== Decommissioning and fate ===
Cottle was decommissioned 6 March 1946 and returned to the Maritime Commission 11 March 1946. She was scrapped in 1973.
