= 148 (number) =

← 147	148	149 →
- ← 140 141 142 143 144 145 146 147 148 149 →: List of numbers; Integers; ← 0 100 200 300 400 500 600 700 800 900 →
- Cardinal: one hundred forty-eight
- Ordinal: 148th (one hundred forty-eighth)
- Factorization: 2^{2} × 37
- Divisors: 1, 2, 4, 37, 74, 148
- Greek numeral: ΡΜΗ´
- Roman numeral: CXLVIII, cxlviii
- Binary: 10010100_{2}
- Ternary: 12111_{3}
- Senary: 404_{6}
- Octal: 224_{8}
- Duodecimal: 104_{12}
- Hexadecimal: 94_{16}

148 (one hundred [and] forty-eight) is the natural number following 147 and before 149.

== In mathematics ==
148 is the second number to be both a heptagonal number and a centered heptagonal number (the first is 1). It is the twelfth member of the Mian–Chowla sequence, the lexicographically smallest sequence of distinct positive integers with distinct pairwise sums.

There are 148 perfect graphs with six vertices, and 148 ways of partitioning four people into subsets, ordering the subsets, and selecting a leader for each subset.

== In other fields ==
Dunbar's number is a theoretical cognitive limit to the number of people with whom one can maintain stable interpersonal relationships. Dunbar predicted a "mean group size" of 148, but this is commonly rounded to 150.
