= 143 BC =

143 BC in various calendars
- Gregorian calendar: 143 BC; CXLIII BC
- Ab urbe condita: 611
- Ancient Egypt era: XXXIII dynasty, 181
- Pharaoh: Ptolemy VIII Physcon, 3
- Ancient Greek Olympiad (summer): 159th Olympiad, year 2
- Assyrian calendar: 4608
- Balinese saka calendar: N/A
- Bengali calendar: −736 – −735
- Berber calendar: 808
- Buddhist calendar: 402
- Burmese calendar: −780
- Byzantine calendar: 5366–5367
- Chinese calendar: 丁酉年 (Fire Rooster); 2555 or 2348 — to — 戊戌年 (Earth Dog); 2556 or 2349
- Coptic calendar: −426 – −425
- Discordian calendar: 1024
- Ethiopian calendar: −150 – −149
- Hebrew calendar: 3618–3619
- Hindu calendars
- Vikram Samvat: −86 – −85
- Shaka Samvat: N/A
- Kali Yuga: 2958–2959
- Holocene calendar: 9858
- Iranian calendar: 764 BP – 763 BP
- Islamic calendar: 787 BH – 786 BH
- Javanese calendar: N/A
- Julian calendar: N/A
- Korean calendar: 2191
- Minguo calendar: 2054 before ROC 民前2054年
- Nanakshahi calendar: −1610
- Seleucid era: 169/170 AG
- Thai solar calendar: 400–401
- Tibetan calendar: མེ་མོ་བྱ་ལོ་ (female Fire-Bird) −16 or −397 or −1169 — to — ས་ཕོ་ཁྱི་ལོ་ (male Earth-Dog) −15 or −396 or −1168

Year 143 BC was a year of the pre-Julian Roman calendar. At the time it was known as the Year of the Consulship of Pulcher and Macedonicus (or, less frequently, year 611 Ab urbe condita). The denomination 143 BC for this year has been used since the early medieval period, when the Anno Domini calendar era became the prevalent method in Europe for naming years.

== Events ==
=== By place ===
==== Roman Republic ====
- The Celtiberian War ends when Quintus Caecilius Metellus Macedonicus crushes the rebels.

== Births ==
- Marcus Antonius, Roman politician and orator (d. 87 BC)

== Deaths ==
- Jonathan Maccabaeus, Jewish leader of the Maccabees
- Zhou Yafu, Chinese general of the Han dynasty
