= USS General E. T. Collins =

Ship built in 1944

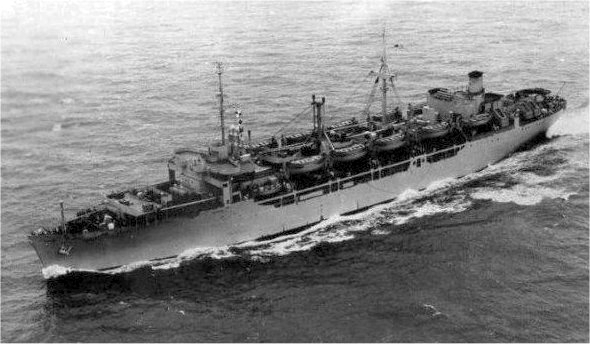
- USNS General E. T. Collins (T-AP-147) underway at sea, in the 1950s

History

United States
- Name: General E. T. Collins
- Namesake: Edgar T. Collins
- Builder: Kaiser Co., Inc., Richmond, California
- Launched: 22 January 1944
- Acquired: 20 July 1944
- Commissioned: 20 July 1944
- Decommissioned: 17 June 1946
- In service: after 17 June 1946 (Army); 1 March 1950 (MSTS)
- Out of service: 1 March 1950 (Army); 30 June 1960 (MSTS)
- Renamed: SS New Orleans
- Reclassified: T-AP-147, 1 March 1950
- Identification: IMO number: 6904818
- Fate: Scrapped

General characteristics
- Class & type: General G. O. Squier-class transport ship
- Displacement: 9,950 tons (light), 17,250 tons (full)
- Length: 522 ft 10 in (159.36 m)
- Beam: 71 ft 6 in (21.79 m)
- Draft: 24 ft (7.32 m)
- Installed power: 9,900 shp (7,400 kW)
- Propulsion: single-screw steam turbine
- Speed: 17 knots (31 km/h)
- Capacity: 2173 troops
- Complement: 356 (officers and enlisted)
- Armament: 4 × 5"/38 caliber guns; 8 × 1.1"/75 AA guns; 16 × 20 mm Oerlikon AA guns

USS General E. T. Collins (AP-147) was a General G. O. Squier-class transport ship for the U.S. Navy in World War II. She was named in honor of U.S. Army general Edgar T. Collins. She was transferred to the U.S. Army as USAT General E. T. Collins in 1946. On 1 March 1950 she was transferred to the Military Sea Transportation Service (MSTS) as USNS General E. T. Collins (T-AP-147). She was later sold for commercial operation under the name SS New Orleans, before being eventually scrapped.

== Operational history ==
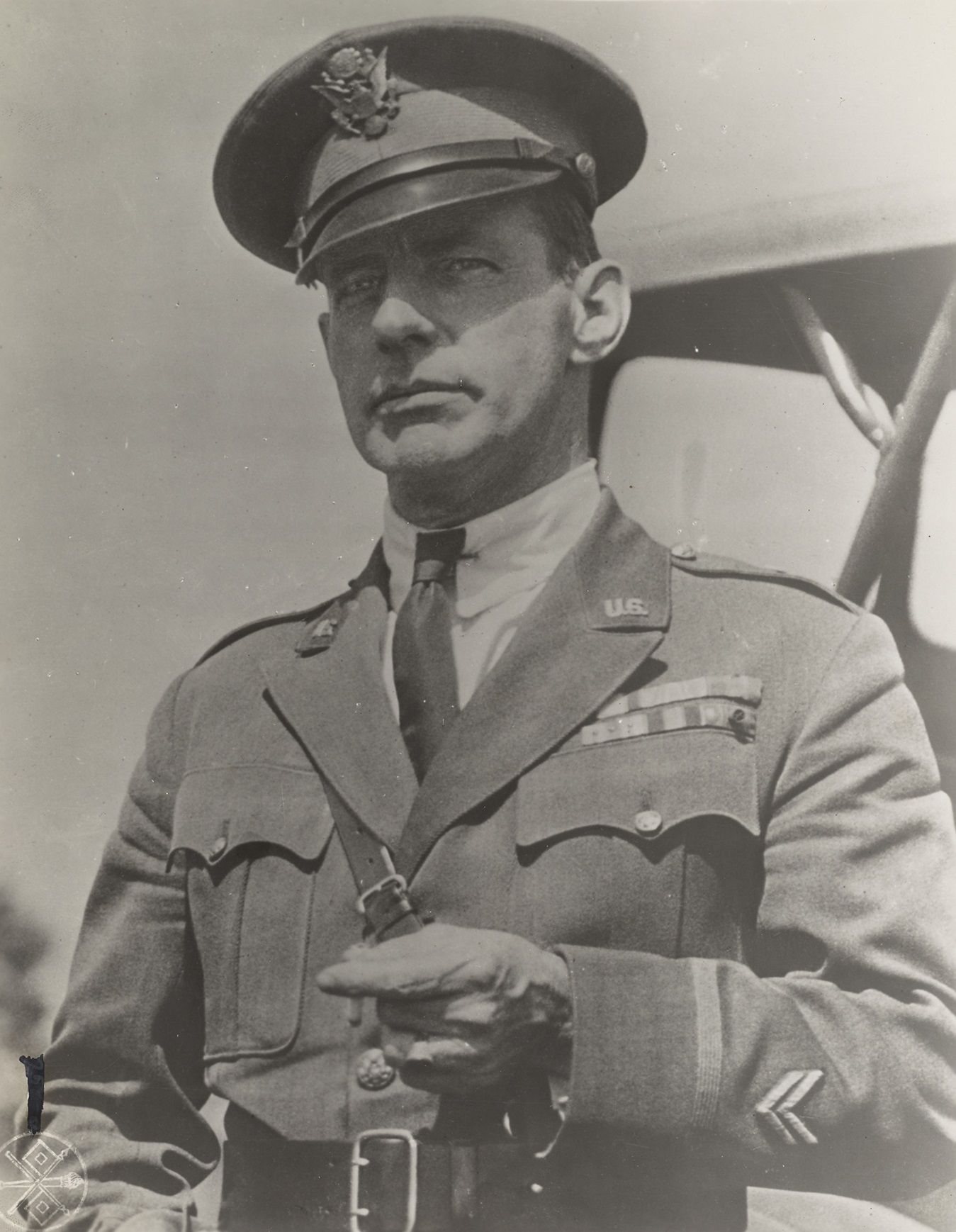
Edgar T. Collins as a U.S. Army brigadier general in 1932

General E. T. Collins (AP-147) was launched 22 January 1944 under Maritime Commission contract (MC #704) by Kaiser Co., Inc., Yard 3, Richmond, California; sponsored by Mrs. Allison J. Barnet: acquired by the Navy and commissioned 20 July 1944.

Following shakedown training out of San Diego, General E. T. Collins departed 14 August 1944 with over 3,000 troops for the Pacific fighting, as America's island campaign increased in momentum. The ship debarked troops at Pearl Harbor, Eniwetok, Saipan, Guam, and Kwajalein before returning to San Francisco 15 October 1944. After a round-trip voyage to Pearl Harbor with additional troops, General E. T. Collins sailed once more 22 December bound for the islands of Micronesia. She carried troops to Eniwetok, Saipan, and Guam to support amphibious operations in the Pacific before returning to Seattle 7 February 1945.

General E. T. Collins returned to the western Pacific in April and for the remainder of the war operated out of Fremantle, Australia, carrying troops to the Pacific islands and India. Following the Japanese surrender, the ship arrived San Pedro 22 September with returning veterans, and joined the "Magic Carpet" fleet in the giant task of bringing home the thousands of troops from the Pacific islands. She made four such voyages in the months to come, stopping at Yokohama and Manila, and arrived San Francisco after the last passage 14 May 1946. General E. T. Collins decommissioned there 17 June 1946 and was turned over to the Maritime Commission for transfer to the Army Transportation Service.

The veteran transport was reacquired by the Navy 1 March 1950 for use by the MSTS with a civil service crew. At the outbreak of the war in Korea, the ship began transporting American troops to that stricken land for the struggle to thwart Communist aggression. She was at Pusan 12 December 1950 when orders came to sail to Hŭngnam for the famous evacuation of U.N. troops from that port. General E. T. Collins arrived 14 December and, under an umbrella of naval gunfire provided by USS Missouri (BB-63) and other ships, took on more than 6,000 exhausted troops, three times her troop-carrying capacity. After these fighters were safely debarked at Pusan, the ship returned to Hŭngnam Christmas Eve to bring out another load of troops to Pusan.

Following this dangerous but successful operation, the transport resumed her vital troop carrying duties between the United States and the Far East. She remained on this service until late 1952; when, during October and November, she was part of the support task unit for Operation Ivy, the atomic tests at Eniwetok.

After the Korean armistice General E. T. Collins continued to rotate troops in Korea and Japan, keeping strong America's presence in the critical Far East. She arrived San Francisco after her final passage 6 October 1954 and was inactivated. General E. T. Collins was returned to the Maritime Administration (MARAD) 30 June 1960 and was placed in the National Defense Reserve Fleet, Suisun Bay, California until she was sold for commercial service in 1968 under the MARAD Ship Exchange Program. The ship was rebuilt by Willamette Iron & Steel Co., Portland, OR as the container ship SS New Orleans, USCG ON 516540, IMO 6904818, for Sea Land Service. In 1975 the ship was sold to Navieras de Puerto Rico, also known as the Puerto Rico Maritime Shipping Authority, and renamed SS Guayama. The ship was sold again to United Southern Shipping Ltd. in 1981 and renamed SS Eastern Kin under Panamanian registry and then scrapped in 1982.

General E. T. Collins received five battle stars for Korean War service.

== Sources ==
- Cudahy, Brian J. (2006). Box Boats: How Container Ships Changed the World. Fordham University Press. ISBN 978-0-8232-2569-9.
- Williams, Greg H. (2013). World War II U.S. Navy Vessels in Private Hands. McFarland Books. ISBN 978-0-7864-6645-0.
