= 147 BC =

147 BC in various calendars
- Gregorian calendar: 147 BC; CXLVII BC
- Ab urbe condita: 607
- Ancient Egypt era: XXXIII dynasty, 177
- Pharaoh: Ptolemy VI Philometor, 34
- Ancient Greek Olympiad (summer): 158th Olympiad, year 2
- Assyrian calendar: 4604
- Balinese saka calendar: N/A
- Bengali calendar: −740 – −739
- Berber calendar: 804
- Buddhist calendar: 398
- Burmese calendar: −784
- Byzantine calendar: 5362–5363
- Chinese calendar: 癸巳年 (Water Snake); 2551 or 2344 — to — 甲午年 (Wood Horse); 2552 or 2345
- Coptic calendar: −430 – −429
- Discordian calendar: 1020
- Ethiopian calendar: −154 – −153
- Hebrew calendar: 3614–3615
- Hindu calendars
- Vikram Samvat: −90 – −89
- Shaka Samvat: N/A
- Kali Yuga: 2954–2955
- Holocene calendar: 9854
- Iranian calendar: 768 BP – 767 BP
- Islamic calendar: 792 BH – 791 BH
- Javanese calendar: N/A
- Julian calendar: N/A
- Korean calendar: 2187
- Minguo calendar: 2058 before ROC 民前2058年
- Nanakshahi calendar: −1614
- Seleucid era: 165/166 AG
- Thai solar calendar: 396–397
- Tibetan calendar: ཆུ་མོ་སྦྲུལ་ལོ་ (female Water-Snake) −20 or −401 or −1173 — to — ཤིང་ཕོ་རྟ་ལོ་ (male Wood-Horse) −19 or −400 or −1172

Year 147 BC was a year of the pre-Julian Roman calendar. At the time it was known as the Year of the Consulship of Aemilianus and Drusus (or, less frequently, year 607 Ab urbe condita). The denomination 147 BC for this year has been used since the early medieval period, when the Anno Domini calendar era became the prevalent method in Europe for naming years.

== Events ==
=== By place ===
==== Ireland ====
- Corlea Trackway completed.

==== Roman Republic ====
- Despite being the five years below the minimum age required, Scipio Aemilianus is elected Consul under popular pressure.
- In Lusitania, Hispania, the Celtic king Viriathus, rallies Lusitanian resistance to Rome.

==== Syria ====
- Demetrius II of Syria returns to Syria (approximate date).
- Jonathan Maccabaeus conquers Joppa.

== Deaths ==
- Bo, Chinese empress of the Western Han dynasty
