= List of highways numbered 149 =

The following highways are numbered 149:

== Canada ==
- Prince Edward Island Route 149

== Costa Rica ==
- National Route 149

== India ==
- National Highway 149 (India)

== Japan ==
- Japan National Route 149

== United Kingdom ==
- A149 road
- B149 road

== United States ==
- Alabama State Route 149
- Arkansas Highway 149
- California State Route 149
- Colorado State Highway 149
- Connecticut Route 149
- Florida State Road 149 (former)
- Georgia State Route 149
- Illinois Route 149
- Indiana State Road 149
- Iowa Highway 149
- K-149 (Kansas highway)
- Kentucky Route 149
- Louisiana Highway 149
- Maine State Route 149
- Massachusetts Route 149
- M-149 (Michigan highway)
- Minnesota State Highway 149
- Mississippi Highway 149
- Missouri Route 149
- New Hampshire Route 149
- New York State Route 149
- North Carolina Highway 149
- Ohio State Route 149
- Oklahoma State Highway 149
- Pennsylvania Route 149 (former)
- Tennessee State Route 149
- Texas State Highway 149
  - Texas State Highway Loop 149
  - Farm to Market Road 149 (Texas)
- Utah State Route 149
- Vermont Route 149
- Virginia State Route 149
- Wisconsin Highway 149 (former)

Territories:

- Puerto Rico Highway 149
  - Puerto Rico Highway 149R

Preceded by 148	Lists of highways 149	Succeeded by 150
