= KiYa 143 =

Diesel snowplough locomotive operated in Japan

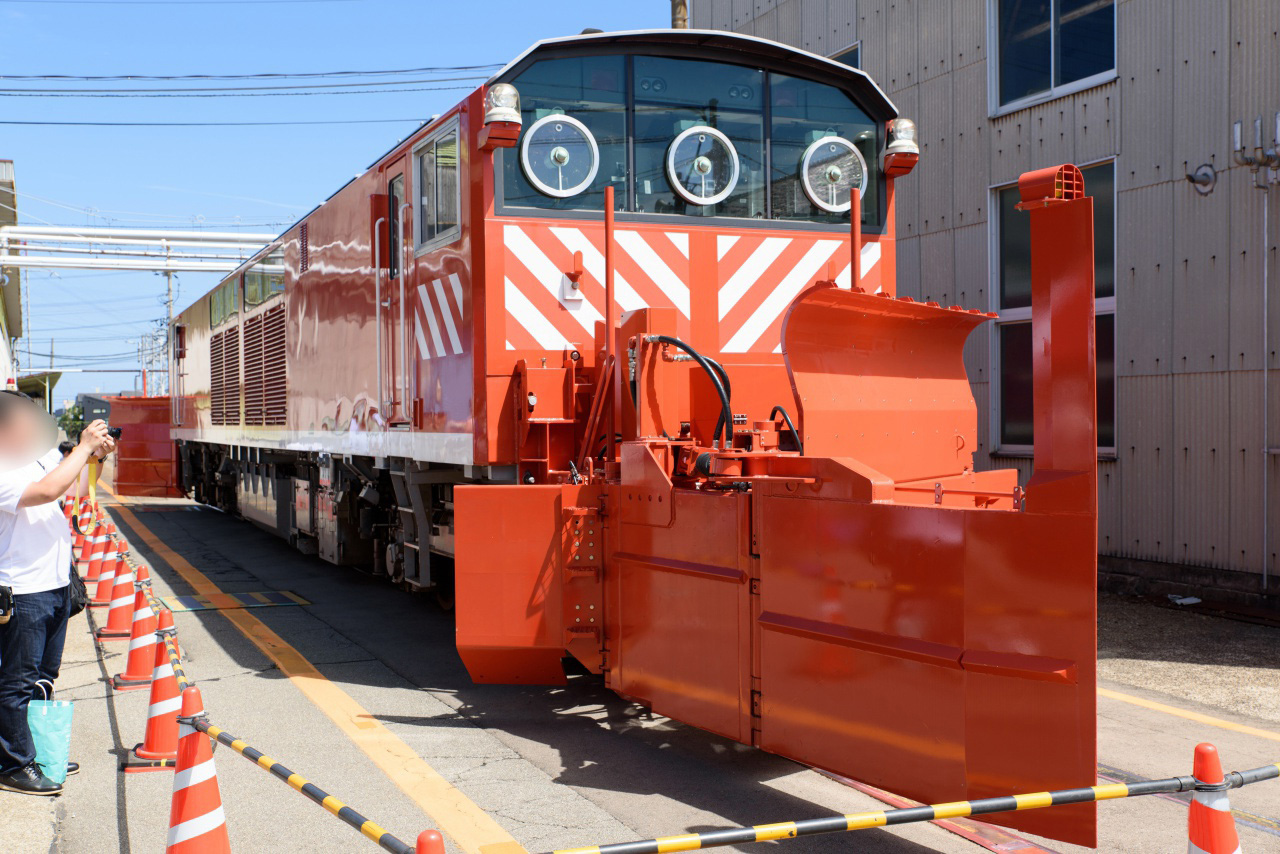
- KiYa 143-2 at Kanazawa Depot in August 2016
Type and origin
- Power type: Diesel-hydraulic
- Builder: Niigata Transys
- Build date: 2014–
Specifications
- Configuration
  - UIC: B-B
- Gauge: 1,067 mm (3 ft 6 in)
- Bogies: WDT68
- Wheel diameter: 860 mm (2 ft 10 in)
- Length: 19,860 mm (65 ft 2 in) (locomotive only); 26,825 mm (88 ft 0.1 in) (with snowplough units)
- Width: 2,989 mm (9 ft 9.7 in)
- Height: 4,087 mm (13 ft 4.9 in)
- Axle load: 14 t
- Loco weight: 51.8 t (locomotive only); 55.4 t (with snowplough units)
- Fuel type: Diesel
- Fuel capacity: 2,000 l
- Engine type: SA6D140HE-2 x2
- Transmission: Hydraulic
Performance figures
- Maximum speed: 75 km/h (45 mph)
- Power output: 900 hp (670 kW)
Career
- Operators: JR West
- Number in class: 9 (as of 1 April 2017)
- Numbers: KiHa 143-1 6–
- Locale: West Japan
- Delivered: February 2014
- First run: 2014
- Disposition: In service

The KiYa 143 (キヤ143形) is a four-axle B-B wheel arrangement diesel-hydraulic locomotive type operated in Japan since 2014 by West Japan Railway Company (JR West).

== Operations ==
The KiYa 143 locomotives are used as self-propelled snowplough units during the winter season, replacing ageing JNR Class DD15 and JNR Class DE15 locomotives, and for hauling non-revenue services during other periods with the snowploughs removed.

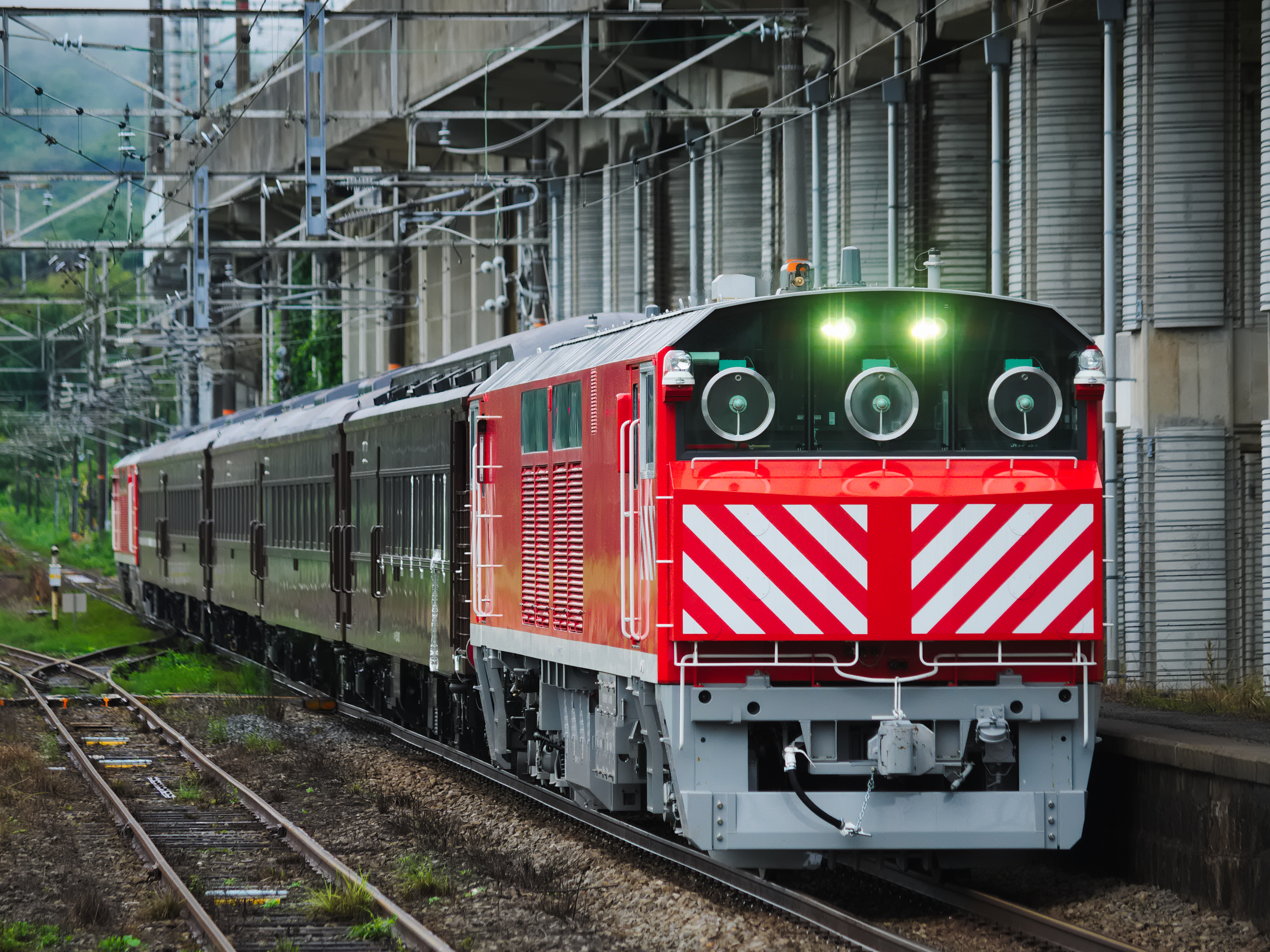
A pair of KiYa 143s top-and-tailing retro-style 35 series coaches on a test run in June 2017

== Design ==
The KiYa 143 locomotives use the same 450 hp (340 kW) diesel engines and braking systems as JR West's KiHa 189 series diesel multiple unit (DMU) trains.

== History ==
The first KiYa 143, KiYa 143-1, was delivered from Niigata Transys in February 2014. This was followed by KiYa 143-2 in March 2014.

== Fleet status ==
As of 1 April 2017, nine KiYa 143 locomotives were in operation, allocated as follows.

Number	Delivered	Depot allocation (as of 1 April 2017)
KiYa 143-1	February 2014	Kanazawa
KiYa 143-2	March 2014	Kanazawa
KiYa 143-3	19 October 2016	Fukuchiyama
KiYa 143-4	1 November 2016	Goto
KiYa 143-5	14 November 2016	Tsuruga
KiYa 143-6	27 February 2017	Fukuchiyama
KiYa 143-7	13 February 2017	Goto
KiYa 143-8	15 March 2017	Goto
KiYa 143-9	21 March 2017	Tsuruga

== Classification ==
While technically a diesel locomotive, the KiYa 143 is classified by JR West according to its diesel multiple unit (DMU) numbering scheme.
