= List of highways numbered 147 =

The following highways are numbered 147:

== Canada ==
- Prince Edward Island Route 147
- Quebec Route 147

== Costa Rica ==
- National Route 147

== India ==
- National Highway 147 (India)

== Japan ==
- Japan National Route 147
- Fukuoka Prefectural Route 147
- Nara Prefectural Route 147

== Malaysia ==
- Malaysia Federal Route 147

== United Kingdom ==
- A147 road
- B147 road

== United States ==
- Alabama State Route 147
- Arkansas Highway 147
- California State Route 147
- Connecticut Route 147
- County Road 147 (Walton County, Florida)
- Georgia State Route 147
- Illinois Route 147
- Iowa Highway 147 (former)
- K-147 (Kansas highway)
- Kentucky Route 147
- Louisiana Highway 147
- Maryland Route 147
- Massachusetts Route 147
- M-147 (Michigan highway)
- County Road 147 (Cass County, Minnesota)
  - County Road 147 (Ramsey County, Minnesota)
- Missouri Route 147
- Nevada State Route 147
- New Jersey Route 147
- New Mexico State Road 147
- New York State Route 147
  - County Route 147 (Monroe County, New York)
  - County Route 147 (Seneca County, New York)
- North Carolina Highway 147
- Ohio State Route 147
- Oklahoma State Highway 147
- Pennsylvania Route 147
- South Dakota Highway 147 (former)
- Tennessee State Route 147
- Texas State Highway 147
  - Texas State Highway Spur 147
  - Farm to Market Road 147
- Utah State Route 147
- Vermont Route 147
- Virginia State Route 147
- Wisconsin Highway 147

Territories

- Puerto Rico Highway 147 (former)

| Preceded by 146 | Lists of highways 147 | Succeeded by 148 |
