= 143 Adria =

Main-belt asteroid

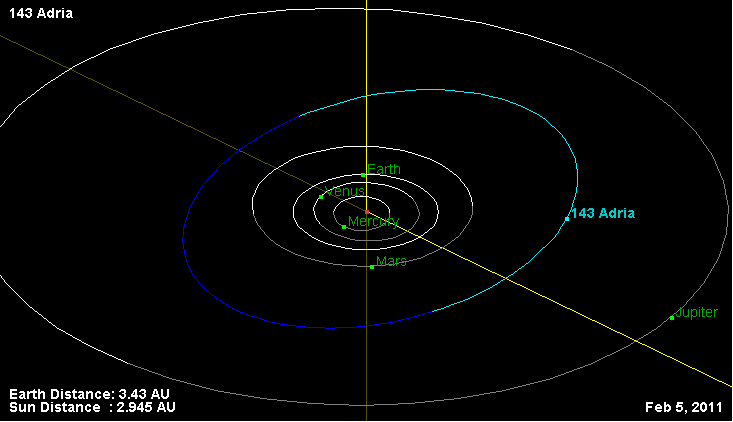
- Orbital diagram

Discovery
- Discovered by: J. Palisa
- Discovery site: Austrian Naval Obs.
- Discovery date: 23 February 1875

Designations
- Pronunciation: /ˈeɪdriə/
- Named after: Adriatic Sea
- Alternative designations: A875 DA; 1960 WK_{1}
- Minor planet category: main-belt · (middle) background

Orbital characteristics
- Epoch 23 March 2018 (JD 2458200.5)
- Uncertainty parameter 0
- Observation arc: 138.03 yr (50,415 d)
- Aphelion: 2.9688 AU
- Perihelion: 2.5557 AU
- Semi-major axis: 2.7622 AU
- Eccentricity: 0.0748
- Orbital period (sidereal): 4.59 yr (1,677 d)
- Mean anomaly: 354.65°
- Mean motion: 0° 12^{m} 52.92^{s} / day
- Inclination: 11.442°
- Longitude of ascending node: 333.04°
- Argument of perihelion: 252.89°

Physical characteristics
- Mean diameter: 89.93±1.9 km
- Mass: (7.5±7.5)×10^{17} kg (Note: Calculated from its standard gravitational parameter GM = 0.05±0.05 km^{3}/s^{2}.) (SB441)
- Mean density: 2.0±2.0 g/cm^{3} (calculated)
- Synodic rotation period: 22.005 h (0.9169 d)
- Geometric albedo: 0.0491±0.002
- Spectral type: C
- Absolute magnitude (H): 9.12

143 Adria is a fairly large main-belt asteroid that was discovered by Austrian astronomer Johann Palisa on 23 February 1875, at the Austrian Naval Observatory, and named after the Adriatic Sea, on the coast of which the discovery was made. This dark-coloured asteroid has probably a primitive carbonaceous chondritic composition.

One occultation by Adria has been reported so far, from Japan on August 21, 2000. A somewhat spherical shape measuring 98 × 86 km was observed.

Photometric observations of this asteroid made during 2008 at the Organ Mesa Observatory in Las Cruces, New Mexico gave an irregular light curve with a period of 22.005 ± 0.001 hours and a brightness variation of 0.08 ± 0.01 in magnitude.
