= 144 BC =

144 BC in various calendars
- Gregorian calendar: 144 BC; CXLIV BC
- Ab urbe condita: 610
- Ancient Egypt era: XXXIII dynasty, 180
- Pharaoh: Ptolemy VIII Physcon, 2
- Ancient Greek Olympiad (summer): 159th Olympiad (victor)¹
- Assyrian calendar: 4607
- Balinese saka calendar: N/A
- Bengali calendar: −737 – −736
- Berber calendar: 807
- Buddhist calendar: 401
- Burmese calendar: −781
- Byzantine calendar: 5365–5366
- Chinese calendar: 丙申年 (Fire Monkey); 2554 or 2347 — to — 丁酉年 (Fire Rooster); 2555 or 2348
- Coptic calendar: −427 – −426
- Discordian calendar: 1023
- Ethiopian calendar: −151 – −150
- Hebrew calendar: 3617–3618
- Hindu calendars
- Vikram Samvat: −87 – −86
- Shaka Samvat: N/A
- Kali Yuga: 2957–2958
- Holocene calendar: 9857
- Iranian calendar: 765 BP – 764 BP
- Islamic calendar: 789 BH – 787 BH
- Javanese calendar: N/A
- Julian calendar: N/A
- Korean calendar: 2190
- Minguo calendar: 2055 before ROC 民前2055年
- Nanakshahi calendar: −1611
- Seleucid era: 168/169 AG
- Thai solar calendar: 399–400
- Tibetan calendar: མེ་ཕོ་སྤྲེ་ལོ་ (male Fire-Monkey) −17 or −398 or −1170 — to — མེ་མོ་བྱ་ལོ་ (female Fire-Bird) −16 or −397 or −1169

Year 144 BC was a year of the pre-Julian Roman calendar. At the time it was known as the Year of the Consulship of Galba and Cotta (or, less frequently, year 610 Ab urbe condita). The denomination 144 BC for this year has been used since the early medieval period, when the Anno Domini calendar era became the prevalent method in Europe for naming years.

== Events ==
=== By place ===
==== Roman Republic ====
- Quintus Marcius Rex starts construction of the Aqua Marcia aqueduct in Rome.

==== Parthia ====
- Parthians take Babylonia.

== Deaths ==
- Liu Wu (a.k.a. Prince Xiao of Liang), Chinese prince of the Han dynasty
