= 146 Lucina =

Main-belt asteroid

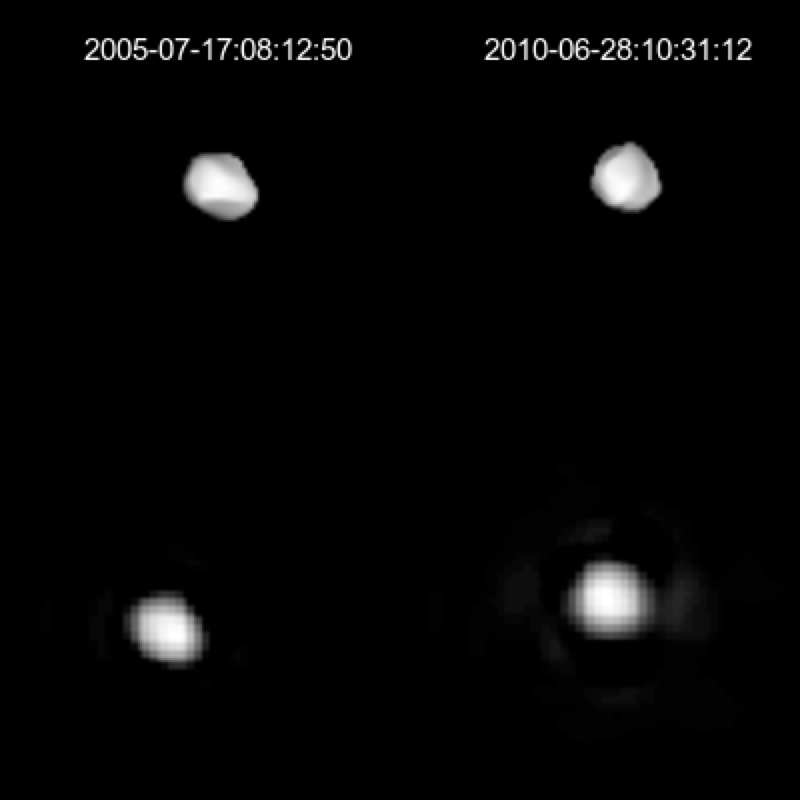
- Lightcurve-base 3D-model of Lucina on the top with an image of the asteroid on the bottom.

Discovery
- Discovered by: Alphonse Borrelly
- Discovery date: 8 June 1875

Designations
- Pronunciation: /luːˈsaɪnə/ or as Latin Lūcīna
- Alternative designations: A875 LC; 1950 CY
- Minor planet category: Main belt

Orbital characteristics
- Epoch 31 July 2016 (JD 2457600.5)
- Uncertainty parameter 0
- Observation arc: 130.35 yr (47610 d)
- Aphelion: 2.89945 AU (433.752 Gm)
- Perihelion: 2.53641 AU (379.442 Gm)
- Semi-major axis: 2.71793 AU (406.597 Gm)
- Eccentricity: 0.066786
- Orbital period (sidereal): 4.48 yr (1636.6 d)
- Average orbital speed: 18.04 km/s
- Mean anomaly: 198.102°
- Mean motion: 0° 13^{m} 11.863^{s} / day
- Inclination: 13.0947°
- Longitude of ascending node: 83.9692°
- Argument of perihelion: 146.982°
- Earth MOID: 1.53233 AU (229.233 Gm)
- Jupiter MOID: 2.14062 AU (320.232 Gm)
- T_{Jupiter}: 3.319

Physical characteristics
- Mean diameter: 131±15 km
- Mass: (1.18±0.28)×10^{18} kg (Note: Calculated from its standard gravitational parameter GM = 0.079±0.019 km^{3}/s^{2}.)
- Mean density: 1.01±0.42 g/cm^{3}
- Equatorial surface gravity: 0.0369 m/s²
- Equatorial escape velocity: 0.0699 km/s
- Synodic rotation period: 18.55387 h (0.773078 d)
- Pole ecliptic longitude: 304° ± 6°
- Pole ecliptic latitude: −41° ± 2°
- Geometric albedo: 0.0531±0.002; 0.0496 ± 0.0107
- Temperature: ~169 K
- Spectral type: C (Tholen)
- Absolute magnitude (H): 8.20, 8.277

146 Lucina is a main-belt asteroid that was discovered by Alphonse Borrelly on June 8, 1875. It was named after Lucina, the Roman goddess of childbirth. This asteroid is large, dark and has a carbonaceous composition. The spectra of the asteroid displays evidence of aqueous alteration.

This body is orbiting the Sun at a distance of 2.72 AU with a low eccentricity of 0.07 and an orbital period of 4.48 years. The orbital plane is inclined at an angle of 13.1° to the plane of the ecliptic. Photometric observations of this asteroid made during 1979 and 1981 gave a light curve with a period of 18.54 hours.

Two stellar occultations by Lucina have been observed so far, in 1982 and 1989. During the first event, a possible small satellite with an estimated 5.7 km diameter was detected at a distance of 1,600 km from 146 Lucina. A 1992 search using a CCD failed to discover a satellite larger than 0.6 km, although it may have been obscured by occultation mask. Further evidence for a satellite emerged in 2003, this time based on astrometric measurements.
