= Clix (website) =

Defunct Portuguese website

Clix was a Portuguese website founded by Novis. In its early years, it was also active as an internet service provider. Until 2013, it was owned by Sonaecom, which in 2013, through Optimus, merged with ZON to form ZON Optimus, which, from May 2014, would operate under the commercial name NOS. The website continued operational until September 2015, when it closed.

== History ==
Novis, Sonae's new telecom operator, began offering web services in October 1999, with the launch of the Clix website and ISP. The website was developed with twenty other specialized companies, among them Público and Editorial Verbo, and launched with twelve channels: Notícias, Internet e Computadores, Software, Ler e Aprender, Moda, Hype, Classificados, Crianças, Automania, Gastronomia, Viajar and Top 100. Notícias was produced with Público. Hype was a guide of "everything that makes news on the internet", especially news on webcasts and chats. Ler e Aprender was produced with Verbo and featured its encyclopedic dictionary. Internet e Computadores and Software were about news from the scene, such as new products and strategies. Top 100 provided the list of the 100 most popular Portuguese websites of the time. Clix also offered a 10 MB free hosting service. IP was in charge of the website; Sonaecom had acquired the company for nearly two million contos.

By July 2001, it had become the second most-accessed Portuguese website, behind SAPO.

On 13 May 2003, Clix introduced a new look, which enabled it to be personalized according to user preferences.

In January 2004, Clix suspended its ADSL offer to pressure Portugal Telecom to lower its internet prices. It also announced its intent to lodge a complaint to the European Commission.

At 12pm on 15 July 2005, following an agreement with Media Capital, all Media Capital Rádios websites moved from IOL to Clix.

A fitness section opened on 24 July 2011. On 2 February 2012, the Boas Notícias website, which started in March 2010 as an independent site, joined Clix. On 17 January 2013, four new blogs joined the service: Barriga Mendinha by Rita Mendes, Mapshow by Marta Argão Pinto, A Mulher é que Manda by Mónica Santana Lopes and Pais de Quatro by João Miguel Tavares and Teresa Mendonça.

On 15 September 2015, over a year after the discontinuation of the Clix brand for telecommunication services, the Clix portal shut down. NOS denied rumors saying that Media Capital took over the website, meaning that collaboration with IOL was merely reduced to traffic redirection. The webmail service, which was independent from the service, continued. NOS rejected creating a successor.
