= 150 (number) =

← 149	150	151 →
- ← 150 151 152 153 154 155 156 157 158 159 →: List of numbers; Integers; ← 0 100 200 300 400 500 600 700 800 900 →
- Cardinal: one hundred fifty
- Ordinal: 150th (one hundred fiftieth)
- Factorization: 2 × 3 × 5^{2}
- Divisors: 1, 2, 3, 5, 6, 10, 15, 25, 30, 50, 75, 150
- Greek numeral: ΡΝ´
- Roman numeral: CL, cl
- Binary: 10010110_{2}
- Ternary: 12120_{3}
- Senary: 410_{6}
- Octal: 226_{8}
- Duodecimal: 106_{12}
- Hexadecimal: 96_{16}

150 (one hundred [and] fifty) is the natural number following 149 and preceding 151.

== In mathematics ==
- 150 is the sum of eight consecutive primes (7 + 11 + 13 + 17 + 19 + 23 + 29 + 31). Given 150, the Mertens function returns 0.
- 150 is conjectured to be the only minimal difference greater than 1 of any increasing arithmetic progression of n primes (in this case, n = 7) that is not a primorial (a product of the first m primes).
- The sum of Euler's totient function φ(x) over the first twenty-two integers is 150.
- 150 is a Harshad number and an abundant number.
- 150 degrees is the measure of the internal angle of a regular dodecagon.
- $F_{11}(150) = 150^{2048} + 1$ is the largest known generalized Fermat prime with even base less than 1000.

== In other fields ==
150 is also:

- The number of degrees in the quincunx astrological aspect explored by Johannes Kepler.
- The approximate value for Dunbar's number, a theoretical value with implications in sociology and anthropology. It is actually 148.
