= 149 (number) =

← 148	149	150 →
- ← 140 141 142 143 144 145 146 147 148 149 →: List of numbers; Integers; ← 0 100 200 300 400 500 600 700 800 900 →
- Cardinal: one hundred forty-nine
- Ordinal: 149th (one hundred forty-ninth)
- Factorization: prime
- Prime: 35th
- Divisors: 1, 149
- Greek numeral: ΡΜΘ´
- Roman numeral: CXLIX, cxlix
- Binary: 10010101_{2}
- Ternary: 12112_{3}
- Senary: 405_{6}
- Octal: 225_{8}
- Duodecimal: 105_{12}
- Hexadecimal: 95_{16}

149 (one hundred [and] forty-nine) is the natural number between 148 and 150.

== In mathematics ==
149 is the 35th prime number, the first prime whose difference from the previous prime is exactly 10, an emirp, and an irregular prime. After 1 and 127, it is the third smallest de Polignac number, an odd number that cannot be represented as a prime plus a power of two. More strongly, after 1, it is the second smallest number that is not a sum of two prime powers.

It is a tribonacci number, being the sum of the three preceding terms, 24, 44, 81.

There are exactly 149 integer points in a closed circular disk of radius 7, and exactly 149 ways of placing six queens (the maximum possible) on a 7 × 7 chess board so that each queen attacks exactly one other. The barycentric subdivision of a tetrahedron produces an abstract simplicial complex with exactly 149 simplices.
