= 400s BC (decade) =

Decade

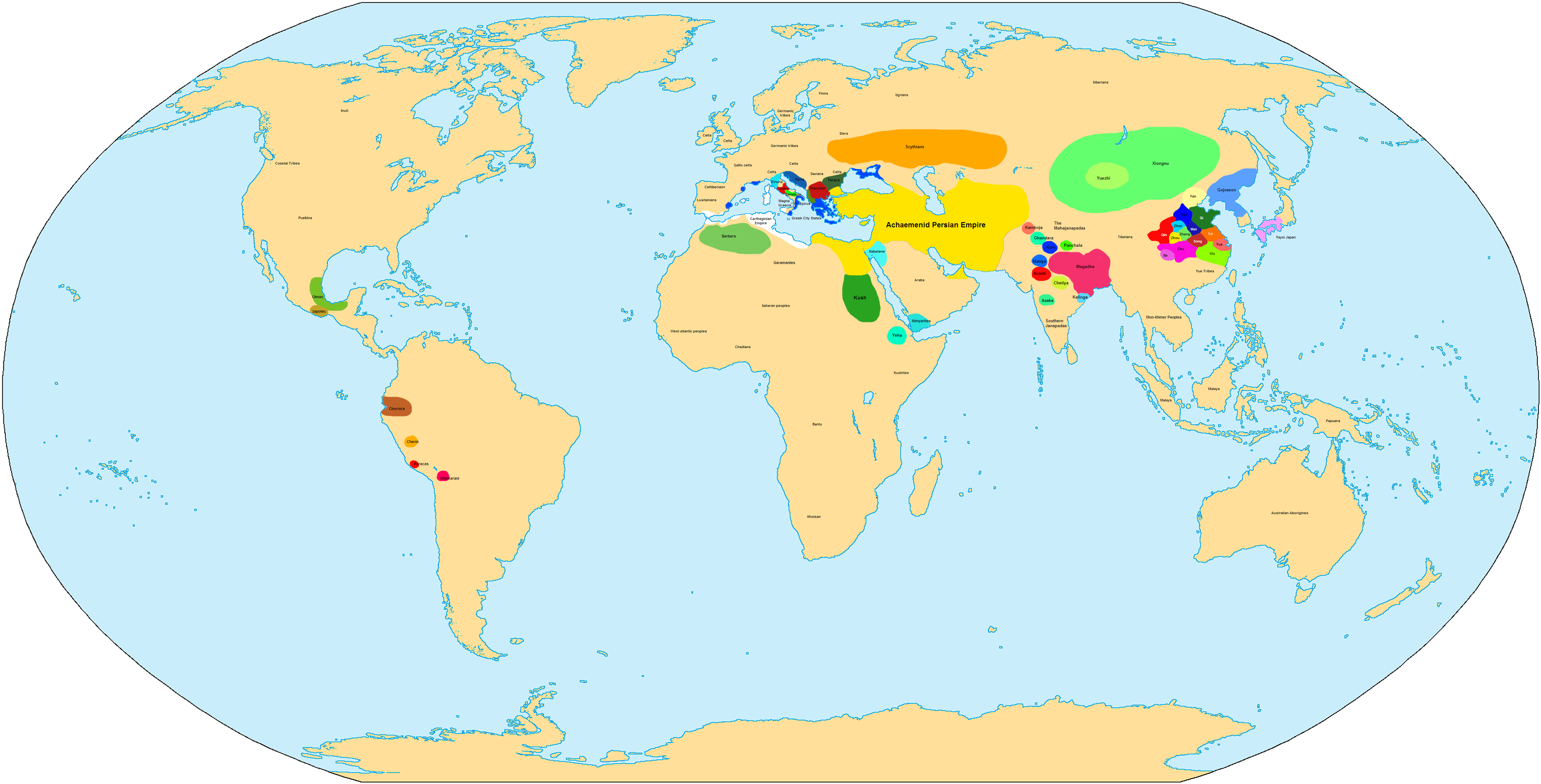
Map of the world in 400 BC.

This article concerns the period 409 BC – 400 BC.

== Events ==
=== 409 BC ===
==== By place ====
====== Greece ======
- Alcibiades recaptures Byzantium, ending the city's rebellion from Athens. This action completes Athenian control of the Bosporus which secures the Athenian supply route for grain from the Bosporan Kingdom in the Black Sea region.
- The Athenian general, Thrasyllus, sails out from Athens with a sizable force to campaign in Ionia. There, he quickly captures Colophon and raids the Ionian countryside, but is defeated outside Ephesus by a combined Ephesian, Persian, and Syracusan force.
- Pausanias succeeds his father Pleistoanax as Agiad king of Sparta.
- The city of Rhodes is founded.

====== Sicily ======
- Taking advantage of the quarrels between the Greek cities in Sicily and of the mutual exhaustion of Athens and Syracuse, Carthage seeks to reimpose its influence over the island. Hannibal Mago, grandson of Hamilcar, invades Sicily with a strong force. He defeats the Sicilian Greeks and avenges his grandfather through the torture and killing of 3,000 Greek prisoners. In the Battle of Selinus and Battle of Himera he captures and destroys both cities before returning triumphantly to Carthage with the spoils of war.

==== By topic ====
====== Literature ======
- Sophocles' play Philoctetes is performed, with the theme of the Trojan War.

=== 408 BC ===
==== By place ====
====== Persian Empire ======
- King Darius II of Persia decides to continue the war against Athens and give support to the Spartans. His wife, Parysatis, persuades him to appoint his younger son, Cyrus, as satrap (governor) of Lydia, Phrygia, and Cappadocia and commander in chief of the Achaemenian forces in Asia Minor in place of Tissaphernes.
- Tissaphernes' influence is limited to the satrapy of Caria. Darius II also gives Cyrus funds to re-create the Spartan fleet and sends him to Sardis with instructions to increase Persian support for Sparta. Cyrus begins to collect an army of mercenaries (including Greeks) for his own ends.

====== Greece ======
- Alcibiades enters Athens in triumph after an absence of 7 years. He leads the religious procession from Athens to Eleusis, thus atoning for his alleged impiety in 415 BC when he was held to have joined in profaning the Sacred Mysteries. Alcibiades is appointed commander-in-chief with autocratic powers and leaves for Samos to rejoin his fleet.
- The Spartan admiral Lysander arrives at Ephesus in autumn and builds up a great fleet with help from the new Persian satrap, Cyrus.
- At the Panhellenic gathering at Olympia, the philosopher Gorgias speaks out against the Spartan alliance with Persia.
- In 408 BC, the three city-states of the island of Rhodes (Ialysos, Kamiros, Lindos) unite and create the homonymous city on the northernmost part of the island.

==== By topic ====
====== Literature ======
- Euripides' plays Orestes and The Phoenician Women are performed. Euripides then leaves Athens in dissatisfaction and travels to the court of Archelaus I of Macedon at the King's invitation.

=== 407 BC ===
==== By place ====
====== Greece ======
- The Athenian general Thrasybulus recaptures Abdera and Thasos.
- The Spartan admiral Lysander refuses to be lured out of Ephesus to do battle with Alcibiades. However, while Alcibiades is away seeking supplies, the Athenian squadron is placed under the command of Antiochus, his helmsman, who is routed by the Spartan fleet (with the help of the Persians under Cyrus) in the Battle of Notium (or Ephesus).
- The defeat gives the enemies of Alcibiades an excuse to strip him of his command. He never returns again to Athens. He sails north to land he owns in the Thracian Chersonese. Except for a brief appearance at Aegospotami, Alcibiades' involvement in the Peloponnesian War is over.

====== Sicily ======
- The exiled former leader of the moderate democrats of Syracuse, Hermocrates, is killed while attempting to force his way back into Syracuse.

=== 406 BC ===
==== By place ====
====== Greece ======
- Callicratidas is appointed as the navarch of the Spartan fleet, replacing Lysander. Callicratidas assembles a fleet and sails to Methymna, on Lesbos, to which he lays siege. This move threatens the Athenian grain supply.
- Alcibiades is replaced by a board of generals. Athens sends a member of the board, Admiral Conon, to relieve the siege of Mytilene. To defend Lesbos, Conon is forced to move his numerically inferior fleet from Samos to the Hekatonnesi islands near Methymna. When Callicratidas attacks him, Conon is forced back to Mytilene, where he is blockaded by Callicratidas' Spartan fleet.
- Athens wins the Battle of Arginusae, near Lesbos, and the blockade of Conon is broken. To relieve Conon, the Athenians assemble a new fleet composed largely of newly constructed ships crewed by inexperienced sailors. This inexperienced fleet is inferior to the Spartans, but its commanders employ new and unorthodox tactics, which allow the Athenians to secure a dramatic and unexpected victory. The Spartan force is soundly defeated, and Callicratidas is killed.
- Returning to Athens after the battle, Theramenes leads Athenian agitation against the eight generals who have commanded in the engagement; the six who have returned to Athens are condemned for negligence in not having picked up survivors from the ships disabled in the battle. The Athenian generals (including Pericles' son) are put to death.
- Sparta sues for peace, which the Athenian leader Cleophon rejects. Sparta yields to demands by the Persian satrap Cyrus that Lysander command a fleet in the Hellespont.

====== Roman Republic ======
- The Roman forces begin a decade-long siege against Veii.

====== Carthage ======
- The Carthaginians again invade Sicily and attack Agrigentum (Acragas). Plague breaks out in their camp and Hannibal Mago dies. Himilco assumes command and captures Agrigentum (Acragas), Gela and Camarina. Gela is destroyed and its treasures sacked. The survivors take refuge in Syracuse. The plague is carried back to Carthage by its soldiers.

=== 405 BC ===
==== By place ====
====== Greece ======
- After their victory in the Battle of Arginusae over the Spartans, the Athenian fleet follows the reappointed Spartan admiral, Lysander, to the Hellespont. The Athenian fleet under Admiral Conon is destroyed by the Spartans under Lysander in the Battle of Aegospotami in the Sea of Marmara and Conon flees to Cyprus.
- The Spartan king Pausanias lays siege to Athens while Lysander's fleet blockades Piraeus. This action closes the grain route through the Hellespont, thereby starving Athens.
- While the Peloponnesians besiege Athens, Theramenes tries to negotiate with Lysander. He is away for three months while Athens is being reduced to starvation. Then he heads the embassy that negotiates the terms of capitulation to the Spartans.

====== Sicily ======
- Dionysius the Elder rises to power as the tyrant of Syracuse. He makes peace with the Carthaginian general, Himilco (whose army has been weakened by the plague), and fortifies Syracuse. This treaty leaves Carthage in control of most of Sicily.
- Dionysius the Elder ruthlessly consolidates and expands his power. He builds a wall around Syracuse and fortifies Epipolae. The Greek citizens of Naxos, Catana, and Leontini are removed from their cities; many of them are enslaved and their homes are given to Sicilian and Italian mercenaries. Dionysius prepares his army to fight against Carthage, which now occupies western and southern Sicily.

==== By topic ====
====== Drama ======
- January – Aristophanes' play The Frogs is performed.
- March/April – Euripides' The Bacchae and Iphigeneia at Aulis are performed posthumously as part of a tetralogy at the City Dionysia festival and win first prize.

====== Art ======
- The Erechtheum, which includes The Porch of Maidens (Caryatid Porch), is completed in the Ionian style on the Acropolis in Athens after 16 years of construction.

=== 404 BC ===
==== By place ====
====== Greece ======
- The Athenian leader Cleophon continues to urge resistance against the Peloponnesians, but the situation becomes desperate and he is arrested, condemned to death and executed.
- Athens, full of refugees and weakened by plague and hunger, capitulates and the Peloponnesian War ends.
- Theramenes secures terms that save the city of Athens from destruction. The Spartans allow Athens to retain its independence. However, Athens loses all its foreign possessions and what is left of its fleet and is required to become an ally of Sparta. The Long Walls around Athens are pulled down. Greek towns across the Aegean Sea in Ionia are again the subjects of the Persian Empire.
- The Spartan general, Lysander, puts in place a puppet government in Athens with the establishment of the oligarchy of the "Thirty Tyrants" under Critias and including Theramenes as a leading member. This government executes a number of citizens and deprives all but a few of their rights.
- Many of Athens' former allies are now ruled by boards of ten (decarchy), often reinforced with garrisons under a Spartan commander (Harmost).
- The Athenian general Thrasybulus is exiled by the Thirty (the oligarchy of Athens), and he retires to Thebes.
- A split develops between Theramenes and Critias who has Theramenes killed (by drinking poison) on charges of treason.
- Emerging after the Spartan victory at Aegospotami, the former Athenian leader, Alcibiades, takes refuge in Phrygia in northwestern Asia Minor with the Persian satrap, Pharnabazus, and seeks their assistance for the Athenians. The Spartans discover his plans and arrange with Pharnabazus to have him assassinated.
- Lysander sails to Samos and conquers it for Sparta.

====== Egypt ======
- Amyrtaeus of Sais successfully leads a revolt against the Persian Empire's control of the Egyptian delta. He becomes the first (and only) pharaoh of the Twenty-eighth Dynasty.

====== Persian Empire ======
- The Persian King Darius II dies of an illness in Babylon. He is succeeded by his son Artaxerxes II (Memnon—'the Mindful').
- Darius II's younger son, Cyrus, is accused by Tissaphernes, the satrap of Caria, of plotting his brother Artaxerxes II's murder. On the intercession of Artaxerxes II and Cyrus's mother, Parysatis, however, Cyrus is pardoned and sent back to his satrapy.

=== 403 BC ===
==== By place ====
====== Greece ======
- Thrasybulus leads the democratic resistance to the new oligarchic government, known as the Thirty Tyrants, that the victorious Spartans have imposed on Athens. He commands a small force of exiles that invades Attica and, in successive battles, defeats first a Spartan garrison and then the forces of the oligarchic government (which includes the Spartan general, Lysander) in the Battle of Munychia. The leader of the Thirty Tyrants, Critias, is killed in the battle.
- The Battle of Piraeus is fought between Athenian exiles, who have defeated the government of the Thirty Tyrants and occupied Piraeus, and a Spartan force sent to combat them. In the battle, the Spartans narrowly defeat the exiles, with both sides suffering large numbers of casualties. After the battle, the Agiad King of Sparta, Pausanias arranges a settlement between the two parties which allows the reunification of Athens and Piraeus, and the re-establishment of democratic government in Athens. The remaining oligarchic Thirty Tyrants are allowed to flee to Eleusis.
- Thrasybulus restores democratic institutions to Athens and grants amnesties to all except the oligarchic extremists. He is helped by Lysias, the Athenian orator, in arguing the case against the oligarchy.
- Andocides, Athenian orator and politician, who has been implicated in the mutilation of the Herms on the eve of the departure of the Athenian expedition against Sicily in 415 BC, returns from exile under the general amnesty.

====== China ======
- The states of Han, Zhao and Wei receive official recognition as Marquesses from the Eastern Zhou dynasty, confirming the Partition of Jin. This is one of the traditional starting points of the Warring States period.
- Marquis Wen of Wei ascends to power in Wei. He sponsors Confucianism and employs able political advisors such as Li Kui, Wu Qi, and Ximen Bao.
- Marquis Lie of Zhao becomes the ruler of the state of Zhao.
- Marquis Jing of Han ascends to power in Han.

====== Rome ======
- Rome elects eight military tribunes with consular power; Manlius Aemilius Mamercus, Lucius Valerius Potitus, Appius Claudius Crassus, Marcus Quinctilius Varus, Lucius Julius Julus, Marcus Postumius, Marcus Furius Camillus, and Marcus Postumius

==== By topic ====
====== Literature ======
- Under archon Eucleides, the Athenians accept a spelling reform, adopting the Ionian alphabet, which includes eta and omega. The new alphabet came to be known as the Euclidean alphabet.

=== 402 BC ===
==== By place ====
====== Greece ======
- Archelaus I, King of Macedonia, helps establish a pro-Macedonian oligarchy in Larissa in Thessaly.

=== 401 BC ===
==== By place ====
====== Persian empire ======
- Cyrus the Younger uses a quarrel with Tissaphernes over the Ionian cities as a pretext for gathering a large army and also pretends to prepare an expedition to Pisidia, in the Taurus Mountains. Cyrus starts out with about 15,220 men, of whom 10,400 are Greek mercenaries. When he reaches the Euphrates River at Thapsacus, he announces that he is marching against Artaxerxes II. He advances unopposed into Babylonia; but Artaxerxes, warned at the last moment by Tissaphernes, hastily gathers an army. The two forces meet in the Battle of Cunaxa, north of Babylon, where Cyrus is slain.

====== Greece ======
- The Greek mercenaries fighting for Cyrus are left stranded after Cyrus' defeat. They fight their way north through hostile Persians, Armenians, and Kurds to Trapezus on the coast of the Black Sea under Xenophon, who becomes their leader when the satrap of Lydia, Tissaphernes, has Clearchus of Sparta and the other senior Greek captains captured and executed.
- Agesilaus II becomes king of Sparta on the death of his stepbrother Agis II.

====== China ======
- Zhou an wang becomes king of the Zhou dynasty of China.

==== By topic ====
====== Literature ======
- Sophocles' tragic play Oedipus at Colonus is performed posthumously. It is produced by his grandson (also called Sophocles) at the Festival of Dionysus in Athens.

=== 400 BC ===
==== By place ====
- Artaxerxes II, king of Persia, appoints Tissaphernes to take over all the districts in Asia Minor over which Artaxerxes II's brother Cyrus had been governor before his revolt.
- Tamõs, the satrap of Ionia, fled from his satrapy in fear of the king's retribution. He loaded his possessions onto his satrapy's fleet of triremes and sailed to Egypt seeking the protection of Psammetichus, the King of the Egyptians. Psammetichus executed Tamõs and his family and took his possessions and fleet for himself.
- When the Greek cities of Ionia heard about Cyrus' defeat they knew Artaxerxes would want to exact his revenge on them for supporting Cyrus. They sent several embassies to Sparta to request the Lacedaemonians assistance. The Spartans sent Thibron who recruits 5,000 soldiers to aid the Ionian Greeks.
- Thibron embarks his army at the Isthmus of Corinth and sails to Ephesus on the Ionian coast. Upon arrival, he recruits an additional 2,000 soldiers and starts his campaign against Tissaphernes.
- Xenophon's "Ten Thousand" make their way back to Greece, with most of the men enlisting with the Spartans. Xenophon's successful march through the Persian Empire encourages Sparta to turn on the Persians and begin wars against the Persians in Asia Minor.
- With the outbreak of the war between Sparta and the Persians, the Athenian admiral, Conon, obtains joint command, with Pharnabazus, of a Persian fleet.
- War breaks out between Sparta and Elis.
- London has its origins on a rise above marshy waters at the point where the Walbrook joins the River Thames. The Celtic king, Belin, rebuilds an earth wall surrounding a few dozen huts and orders a small landing place to be cut into the south side of the wall, along the river front, where a wooden quay is built (approximate date).
- Amyrtaeus of Sais successfully completes a revolt against Persian control by gaining control of all of Upper Egypt.
- The Olmec culture in Mesoamerica comes to an end as its city of La Venta is abandoned (approximate date).
- San Lorenzo Tenochtitlán is abandoned (approximate date).
- The Bianzhong of the Marquis Yi of Zheng are cast.
- India had the biggest epic on earth - The Mahabharata.

==== By topic ====
- The catapult is invented by Greek engineers.
- The Mature classical period of sculpture ends in Ancient Greece and is succeeded by the fourth-century (Late Classical) period (approximate date).
- A model of the Acropolis of Athens is made. It is now kept at the Royal Ontario Museum in Toronto, Ontario, Canada (approximate date).
- Theodorus from Phokaia in Asia Minor, builds the Tholos of Delphi, the sanctuary of Athena Pronaia in Delphi (approximate date).
- Dionysius I, Greek tyrant of Syracuse, confiscates gold and silver coins and re-mints them, keeping the weight the same but changing the denomination from one to two drachmae — the first known official devaluation at the expense of the general population. A virulent inflation ensues (approximate date).
- Zoroastrianism becomes the faith of many Persians. The Zoroastrians believe in a struggle between their god, Mazda, and the devil. They believe that the birth of their founder, the prophet Zarathustra, was the beginning of a final epoch that is to end in an Armageddon and triumph of good and evil.
- Brahmanism starts evolving in Hinduism, a process which takes place over the following 200 years (approximate date).

== Births ==
408 BC

- Eudoxus of Cnidus, Greek astronomer, mathematician, physician, scholar and adherent of Pythagoras (d. c. 355 BC)
- Dion, tyrant of Syracuse (d. c. 354 BC)

407 BC

- Speusippus, Greek philosopher (d. 339 BC)

402 BC

- Phocion, Athenian statesman and general (d. c. 318 BC)

400 BC

- Antipater, a Macedonian general (d. 319 BC).
- Parmenion, Macedonian general under Alexander the Great (d. 330 BC).

== Deaths ==
409 BC

- Pleistoanax, king of Sparta since 458 BC

408 BC

- Hippodamus of Miletus, Greek urban planner and polymath (b. 498 BC)

407 BC

- Hermocrates, leader of the moderate democrats of Syracuse

406 BC

- Euripides, Athenian playwright (b. c. 480 BC)
- Hannibal Mago, Carthaginian general
- Sophocles, Athenian dramatist and politician (b. c. 495 BC)

405 BC

- Philolaus, Greek mathematician and philosopher (approximate date) (b. c. 480 BC)

404 BC

- Alcibiades, Athenian statesman (b. c. 450 BC)
- Cleophon, Athenian politician and demagogue
- Darius II Ochus, King of the Persian Empire
- Theramenes, Athenian statesman

403 BC

- Critias, leading member of the Athenian Thirty Tyrants oligarchy (b. 460 BC)

402 BC

- Zhou wei lie wang, king of the Zhou dynasty of China

401 BC

- Agis II, Eurypontid king of Sparta
- Clearchus, Spartan general and mercenary
- Cyrus the Younger, younger son of Darius II, King of Persia

400 BC

- Aspasia of Miletus, widow of Pericles of Athens (approximate date) (b. c. 470 BC)
- Siddhārtha Gautama (also known as Buddha), founder of Buddhism (approximate date)
- Thucydides, Greek historian (approximate date) (b. c. 460 BC)
