= 280s BC =

Decade

This article concerns the period 289 BC – 280 BC.

== Births ==
287 BC

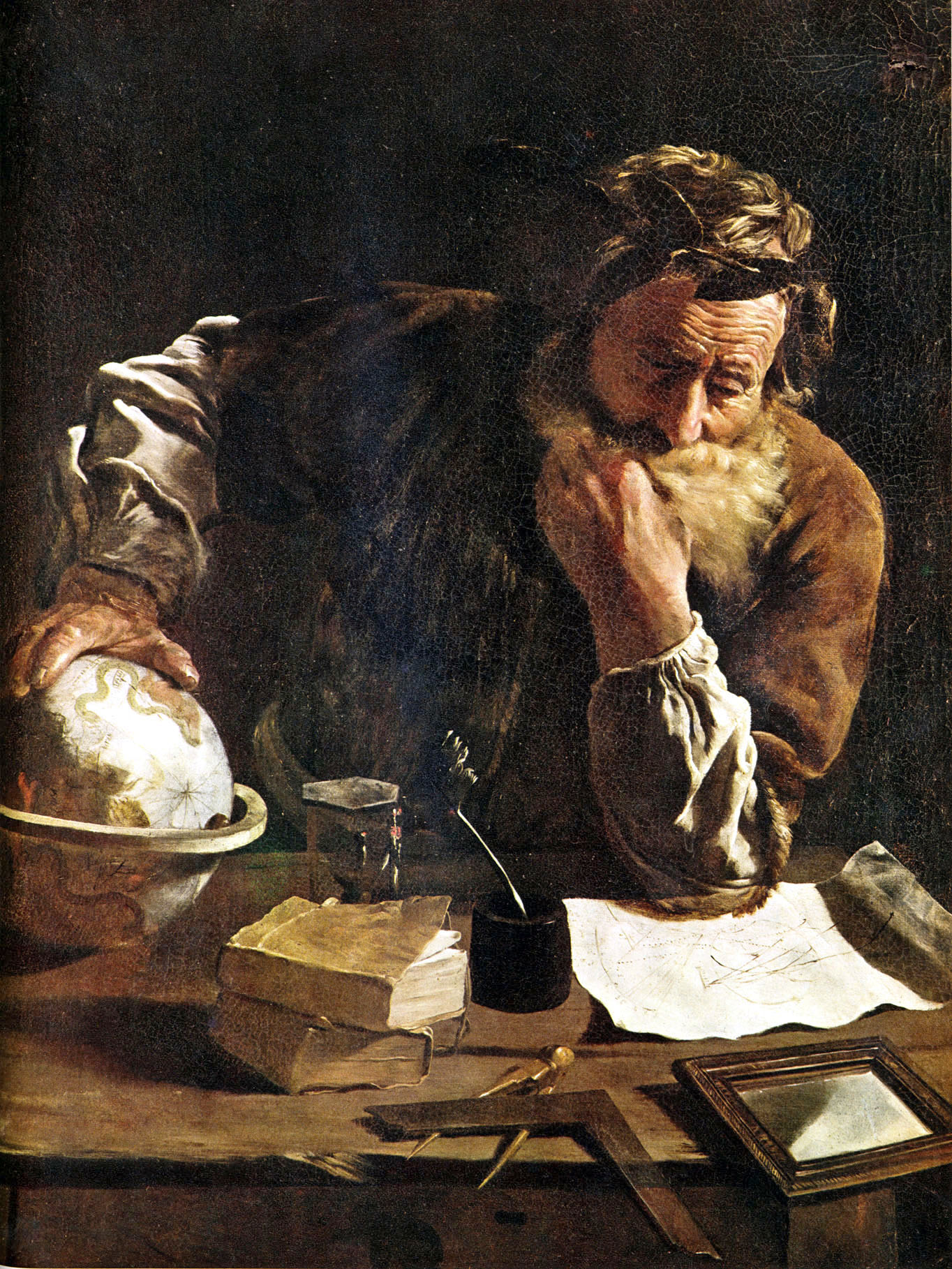
Archimedes
- Archimedes of Syracuse, Greek mathematician, physicist, engineer, astronomer and philosopher (approximate date) (d. c. 212 BC)

286 BC

- Antiochus II Theos, king of the Hellenistic Seleucid Kingdom from 261 BC (d. 246 BC)

281 BC

- Zhuangxiang of Qin, Chinese king of the Qin State (d. 247 BC)

280 BC

- Han Fei, Chinese philosopher who has developed Xun Zi's philosophy (approximate date)
- Li Si, influential prime minister (or chancellor) of the feudal state and later of the dynasty of Qin (approximate date) (d. 208 BC)
- Philo of Byzantium, a Greek writer on mechanics (approximate date) (d. c. 220 BC)

== Deaths ==
289 BC

- Agathocles, tyrant of Syracuse, Sicily from 317 BC and self-styled king of Sicily after 304 BC (b. 361 BC)
- Mencius (Mèng Zǐ or Meng Zhu), Chinese philosopher (approximate date) (b. c. 372 BC)

287 BC

- Phila, daughter of Antipater, the regent of Macedonia
- Theophrastus, Greek Peripatetic philosopher and pupil of Aristotle (b. c. 372 BC)

285 BC

- Dicaearchus, Greek philosopher, cartographer, geographer, mathematician and author (b. c. 350 BC)
- Theophrastus, Greek philosopher, a native of Eressos in Lesbos, the successor of Aristotle in the Peripatetic school (b. c. 370 BC)

284 BC

- Agathocles, son of King Lysimachus of Thrace
- Ardvates, governor and later ruler of Armenia who founds a dynasty that will rule until 211 BC
- Lucius Caecilius Metellus Denter, Roman consul and general (killed in the Battle of Arretium) (b. c. 320 BC)

283 BC

- Demetrius I Poliorcetes, King of Macedonia (b. 336 BC)

282 BC

- Ptolemy I Soter, Macedonian military general who served under Alexander the Great and became ruler of Egypt (born c.367)

281 BC

- Lysimachus, king of Thrace and Macedonia (b. c. 360 BC)
- Seleucus I Nicator, founder of the Seleucid Empire (b. c. 354 BC)

280 BC

- Demetrius of Phaleron (or Demetrius Phalereus), Athenian orator, statesman, and philosopher, who has become prominent at the court of Ptolemy I, enjoying a high reputation as an orator (b. c. 350 BC)
- Herophilus, Alexandrian physician who has been an early performer of public dissections on human cadavers; often called the father of anatomy (b. c. 335 BC)
