= 347 BC =

347 BC in various calendars
Gregorian calendar	347 BC; CCCXLVII BC
Ab urbe condita	407
Ancient Egypt era	XXX dynasty, 34
Pharaoh	Nectanebo II, 14
Ancient Greek Olympiad (summer)	108th Olympiad, year 2
Assyrian calendar	4404
Balinese saka calendar	N/A
Bengali calendar	−940 – −939
Berber calendar	604
Buddhist calendar	198
Burmese calendar	−984
Byzantine calendar	5162–5163
Chinese calendar	癸酉年 (Water Rooster); 2351 or 2144 — to — 甲戌年 (Wood Dog); 2352 or 2145
Coptic calendar	−630 – −629
Discordian calendar	820
Ethiopian calendar	−354 – −353
Hebrew calendar	3414–3415
- Hindu calendars
Vikram Samvat	−290 – −289
Shaka Samvat	N/A
Kali Yuga	2754–2755
Holocene calendar	9654
Iranian calendar	968 BP – 967 BP
Islamic calendar	998 BH – 997 BH
Javanese calendar	N/A
Julian calendar	N/A
Korean calendar	1987
Minguo calendar	2258 before ROC 民前2258年
Nanakshahi calendar	−1814
Thai solar calendar	196–197
Tibetan calendar	ཆུ་མོ་བྱ་ལོ་ (female Water-Bird) −220 or −601 or −1373 — to — ཤིང་ཕོ་ཁྱི་ལོ་ (male Wood-Dog) −219 or −600 or −1372

Year 347 BC was a year of the pre-Julian Roman calendar. At the time it was known in Rome as the Year of the Consulship of Venno and Torquatus (or, less frequently, year 407 Ab urbe condita). The denomination 347 BC for this year has been used since the early medieval period, when the Anno Domini calendar era became the prevalent method in Europe for naming years.

== Events ==
=== By place ===
==== Greece ====
- In the wake of the Macedonian victory at Olynthus, Athens seeks to make peace with Macedonia. Because his financial policy is based on the assumption that Athens should not be involved in major wars, the Athenian leader, Eubulus, works for peace with Philip II of Macedon. Demosthenes is among those who support a compromise.
- An Athenian delegation, comprising Demosthenes, Aeschines and Philocrates, is officially sent to Pella to negotiate a peace treaty with Philip II. During the negotiations, Aeschines seeks to reconcile the Athenians to Macedonia's expansion into Greece. Demosthenes became unhappy with the result.

==== Roman Republic ====
- Coinage is introduced into Rome for the first time.

=== By topic ===
==== Philosophy ====
- Plato dies and his nephew Speusippus is named as head of the Academy.
- Aristotle leaves Athens due to the anti-Macedonian feeling that arises in Athens after Philip II of Macedon has sacked the Greek city-state of Olynthus in 348 BC. With him goes another Academy member of note, Xenocrates of Chalcedon. They establish a new academy on the Asia Minor side of the Aegean Sea at the newly built town of Assus.

== Deaths ==
- Archytas, Greek philosopher, mathematician and statesman (or 350 BC) (b. 428 BC)
- Plato, Greek philosopher and founder of the Academy in Athens (b. c. 427 BC)
- Eudoxus of Cnidus, Greek philosopher and astronomer who has expanded on Plato's ideas (or 355 BC) (b. 410 BC or 408 BC)
