= 341 BC =

341 BC in various calendars
| Gregorian calendar | 341 BC; CCCXLI BC |
| Ab urbe condita | 413 |
| Ancient Egypt era | XXXI dynasty, 3 |
| Pharaoh | Artaxerxes III of Persia, 3 |
| Ancient Greek Olympiad (summer) | 109th Olympiad, year 4 |
| Assyrian calendar | 4410 |
| Balinese saka calendar | N/A |
| Bengali calendar | −934 – −933 |
| Berber calendar | 610 |
| Buddhist calendar | 204 |
| Burmese calendar | −978 |
| Byzantine calendar | 5168–5169 |
| Chinese calendar | 己卯年 (Earth Rabbit); 2357 or 2150 — to — 庚辰年 (Metal Dragon); 2358 or 2151 |
| Coptic calendar | −624 – −623 |
| Discordian calendar | 826 |
| Ethiopian calendar | −348 – −347 |
| Hebrew calendar | 3420–3421 |
- Hindu calendars
| Vikram Samvat | −284 – −283 |
| Shaka Samvat | N/A |
| Kali Yuga | 2760–2761 |
| Holocene calendar | 9660 |
| Iranian calendar | 962 BP – 961 BP |
| Islamic calendar | 992 BH – 991 BH |
| Javanese calendar | N/A |
| Julian calendar | N/A |
| Korean calendar | 1993 |
| Minguo calendar | 2252 before ROC 民前2252年 |
| Nanakshahi calendar | −1808 |
| Thai solar calendar | 202–203 |
| Tibetan calendar | 阴土兔年 (female Earth-Rabbit) −214 or −595 or −1367 — to — 阳金龙年 (male Iron-Dragon) −213 or −594 or −1366 |

Year 341 BC was a year of the pre-Julian Roman calendar. At the time it was known as the Year of the Consulship of Venno and Privernas (or, less frequently, year 413 Ab urbe condita). The denomination 341 BC for this year has been used since the early medieval period, when the Anno Domini calendar era became the prevalent method in Europe for naming years.

== Events ==
=== By place ===
==== Macedonia ====
- Philip II of Macedon completes his annexation of Thrace. This is regarded by Athens as a further threat to the city's safety.

==== Greece ====
- Demosthenes delivers his Third Philippic. In it, he demands resolute action against Philip II. Demosthenes now dominates Athenian politics and is able to considerably weaken the pro-Macedonian faction led by Aeschines. As a result, Demosthenes becomes controller of the Athenian navy.
- A grand alliance is organised by Demosthenes against Philip II, which includes Byzantium and former enemies of Athens, such as Thebes. These developments worry Philip and increase his anger towards Demosthenes. The Athenian Assembly, however, lays aside Philip's grievances against Demosthenes' conduct and denounces the Peace of Philocrates which has been signed by both sides in 346 BC, an action equivalent to an official declaration of war by Athens against Macedonia.

==== Roman Republic ====
- The First Samnite War ends with Rome triumphant and the Samnites willing to make peace.

== Births ==
- Epicurus, Greek philosopher was born in Samos
