= 415th Regiment =

415th Regiment may refer to:

- 415th Infantry Regiment, United States
- 415th (Thames and Medway) Coast Regiment, Royal Artillery

== See also ==
- 415th (disambiguation)
