= Philoteris =

- Location of the site
- 29°22′46″N 30°27′53″E
- Cultures: Greek, Egyptian
- Location: Faiyum Governorate, Egypt

History
- Built: 280 BC

Philoteris was a village in ancient Egypt located in the Faiyum Oasis. It was founded c. 280s BC by Pharaoh Ptolemy II Philadelphus of the Ptolemaic Kingdom, who named it for his sister, Philotera. At the time of its founding, approximately 800 inhabitants were Ancient Egyptians, while 400 were Ancient Greeks.

In 2017, the first Egyptian–Greek gymnasium from the Hellenistic period was found in the ruins of Philoteris by the German Archaeological Institute (DAI). The structure had a hall for meetings, a dining hall, courtyard, 200-metre (660 ft) race track, and gardens in what was "an ideal layout for a center of Greek learning." Contemporaneously, the gymnasium was only for males under 31; "women, slaves, freedmen, tradesmen, male prostitutes, drunkards and madmen were excluded." One of DAI's archaeological scholars in Egypt, Professor Cornelia Römer, told Deutsche Welle that "the gymnasium of [Philoteris] clearly shows the impact of Greek life in Egypt, not only in Alexandria, but also in the countryside".

In the present day the site is known as Madinat Watfa and is located 50 miles (80 km) southwest of Cairo.
