= 427 BC =

427 BC in various calendars
| Gregorian calendar | 427 BC; CDXXVII BC |
| Ab urbe condita | 327 |
| Ancient Egypt era | XXVII dynasty, 99 |
| Pharaoh | Artaxerxes I of Persia, 39 |
| Ancient Greek Olympiad (summer) | 88th Olympiad, year 2 |
| Assyrian calendar | 4324 |
| Balinese saka calendar | N/A |
| Bengali calendar | −1020 – −1019 |
| Berber calendar | 524 |
| Buddhist calendar | 118 |
| Burmese calendar | −1064 |
| Byzantine calendar | 5082–5083 |
| Chinese calendar | 癸丑年 (Water Ox); 2271 or 2064 — to — 甲寅年 (Wood Tiger); 2272 or 2065 |
| Coptic calendar | −710 – −709 |
| Discordian calendar | 740 |
| Ethiopian calendar | −434 – −433 |
| Hebrew calendar | 3334–3335 |
- Hindu calendars
| Vikram Samvat | −370 – −369 |
| Shaka Samvat | N/A |
| Kali Yuga | 2674–2675 |
| Holocene calendar | 9574 |
| Iranian calendar | 1048 BP – 1047 BP |
| Islamic calendar | 1080 BH – 1079 BH |
| Javanese calendar | N/A |
| Julian calendar | N/A |
| Korean calendar | 1907 |
| Minguo calendar | 2338 before ROC 民前2338年 |
| Nanakshahi calendar | −1894 |
| Thai solar calendar | 116–117 |
| Tibetan calendar | 阴水牛年 (female Water-Ox) −300 or −681 or −1453 — to — 阳木虎年 (male Wood-Tiger) −299 or −680 or −1452 |

Year 427 BC was a year of the pre-Julian Roman calendar. At the time, it was known as the Year of the Consulship of Ahala and Mugillanus (or, less frequently, year 327 Ab urbe condita). The denomination 427 BC for this year has been used since the early medieval period, when the Anno Domini calendar era became the prevalent method in Europe for naming years.

== Events ==
=== By place ===
==== Greece ====
- Aristophanes produces Daitaleis (The Banqueters)
- Sparta's King Archidamus II is succeeded by his son Agis II.
- Following the surrender of Mytilene to Athens, the Athenian leader Cleon insists that the city be destroyed. In response to the pleadings of a number of Athenian citizens, Cleon's decree to destroy the population of Mytilene is reversed with only the ringleaders of the Mytilenean revolt being executed.
- Plataea surrenders to the Spartans and Thebans after its garrison comes close to death from starvation. Over 200 prisoners are put to death and Plataea is destroyed.
- The civil war in Corcyra, in which the Athenians and the Spartans have interfered ineffectually, results in a victory of the democrats (who support an alliance with Athens) over the oligarchs.
- In an effort to blockade Sparta from access to Sicilian corn, Athens responds to a plea for help from a delegation from the city of Leontini led by Gorgias, the sophist and rhetorician. Leontini is being threatened by Syracuse which is allied to Sparta. However, the Athenian mission led by the Athenian general Laches is unable to offer much help. Laches is later prosecuted by Cleon for his unsuccessful mission to support Athenian interests in Sicily.

==== Roman Republic ====
- The Quaestorship is opened to the Plebs.

== Births ==
- Plato, Greek philosopher (d. c. 347 BC)

== Deaths ==
- Archidamus II, king of Sparta
