= 370 BC =

370 BC in various calendars
Gregorian calendar	370 BC; CCCLXX BC
Ab urbe condita	384
Ancient Egypt era	XXX dynasty, 11
Pharaoh	Nectanebo I, 11
Ancient Greek Olympiad (summer)	102nd Olympiad, year 3
Assyrian calendar	4381
Balinese saka calendar	N/A
Bengali calendar	−963 – −962
Berber calendar	581
Buddhist calendar	175
Burmese calendar	−1007
Byzantine calendar	5139–5140
Chinese calendar	庚戌年 (Metal Dog); 2328 or 2121 — to — 辛亥年 (Metal Pig); 2329 or 2122
Coptic calendar	−653 – −652
Discordian calendar	797
Ethiopian calendar	−377 – −376
Hebrew calendar	3391–3392
- Hindu calendars
Vikram Samvat	−313 – −312
Shaka Samvat	N/A
Kali Yuga	2731–2732
Holocene calendar	9631
Iranian calendar	991 BP – 990 BP
Islamic calendar	1021 BH – 1020 BH
Javanese calendar	N/A
Julian calendar	N/A
Korean calendar	1964
Minguo calendar	2281 before ROC 民前2281年
Nanakshahi calendar	−1837
Thai solar calendar	173–174
Tibetan calendar	阳金狗年 (male Iron-Dog) −243 or −624 or −1396 — to — 阴金猪年 (female Iron-Pig) −242 or −623 or −1395

Year 370 BC was a year of the pre-Julian Roman calendar. At the time, it was known as the Year of the Tribunate of Capitolinus, Medullinus, Praetextatus, Cornelius, Volusus and Poplicola (or, less frequently, year 384 Ab urbe condita). The denomination 370 BC for this year has been used since the early medieval period, when the Anno Domini calendar era became the prevalent method in Europe for naming years.

== Events ==
=== By place ===
==== Greece ====
- The Spartans under King Agesilaus II invade Arcadia. After appealing in vain to the Athenians for help, Arcadia turns to the Thebans. Epaminondas of Thebes arrives with an army, finds that the Spartans have retired and follows them.
- With the support of Thebes, the Arcadian capital city of Megalopolis is completed and a democratic system is set up with an Assembly of Ten Thousand and a Council of fifty.
- The tagus of Thessaly, Jason of Pherae, dies, after making Thessaly a powerful force in Greek politics.

=== By topic ===
==== Art ====
- The sculptor Praxiteles begins his active career in Athens (approximate date).

==== Mathematics ====
- Eudoxus of Cnidus develops the method of exhaustion for mathematically determining the area under a curve.

== Births ==
- Marcus Valerius Corvus, Roman hero (d. c. 270 BC)
- Theophrastus, Greek philosopher, a native of Eressos in Lesbos, the successor of Aristotle in the Peripatetic school (d. c. 285 BC) Chanakya

== Deaths ==
- Agesipolis II, Agiad king of Sparta
- Democritus of Abdera, Greek philosopher (approximate date) (b. c. 460 BC)
- Hippocrates of Cos, Greek physician (b. c. 460 BC)
- Jason of Pherae, ruler of Thessaly
