= 431 BC =

431 BC in various calendars
- Gregorian calendar: 431 BC; CDXXXI BC
- Ab urbe condita: 323
- Ancient Egypt era: XXVII dynasty, 95
- Pharaoh: Artaxerxes I of Persia, 35
- Ancient Greek Olympiad (summer): 87th Olympiad, year 2
- Assyrian calendar: 4320
- Balinese saka calendar: N/A
- Bengali calendar: −1024 – −1023
- Berber calendar: 520
- Buddhist calendar: 114
- Burmese calendar: −1068
- Byzantine calendar: 5078–5079
- Chinese calendar: 己酉年 (Earth Rooster); 2267 or 2060 — to — 庚戌年 (Metal Dog); 2268 or 2061
- Coptic calendar: −714 – −713
- Discordian calendar: 736
- Ethiopian calendar: −438 – −437
- Hebrew calendar: 3330–3331
- Hindu calendars
- Vikram Samvat: −374 – −373
- Shaka Samvat: N/A
- Kali Yuga: 2670–2671
- Holocene calendar: 9570
- Iranian calendar: 1052 BP – 1051 BP
- Islamic calendar: 1084 BH – 1083 BH
- Javanese calendar: N/A
- Julian calendar: N/A
- Korean calendar: 1903
- Minguo calendar: 2342 before ROC 民前2342年
- Nanakshahi calendar: −1898
- Thai solar calendar: 112–113
- Tibetan calendar: ས་མོ་བྱ་ལོ་ (female Earth-Bird) −304 or −685 or −1457 — to — ལྕགས་ཕོ་ཁྱི་ལོ་ (male Iron-Dog) −303 or −684 or −1456

Year 431 BC was a year of the pre-Julian Roman calendar. At the time, to Romans it was known as the Year of the Consulship of Cincinnatus and Mento (or, less frequently, year 323 Ab urbe condita). The denomination 431 BC for this year has been used since the early medieval period, when the Anno Domini calendar era became the prevalent method in Europe for naming years.

== Events ==
=== By place ===
==== Greece ====
- Athens enters into an alliance with King Sitalkes of Thrace, after Nymphodorus, an influential Athenian, marries Sitalkes' sister. Nymphodorus then negotiates an agreement between Athens and Macedon's King Perdiccas II, through which Perdiccas regains Therma. As a result, Athens withdraws its support for Perdiccas' brother, Philip, and the Thracians promise to assist Perdiccas in capturing him. In return, Perdiccas marches on the Chalcidians, the people he has originally persuaded to revolt.
- A Theban raid on Plataea, the only pro-Athenian city in Boeotia, is a failure and the Plataeans take 180 prisoners and put them to death. Athens supports Plataea while Sparta aligns itself with Thebes. Sparta enlists the help of the Greek cities in Italy and Sicily. Both Sparta and Athens appeal to Persia, but without result.
- The Spartans, led by King Archidamus II, invade Attica effectively starting the first phase of the Peloponnesian War, actually the second of such wars, between the Athens-led Delian League and the Sparta-led Peloponnesian League. The Spartans lay waste to the countryside around Athens. Athenian leader, Pericles, does not seriously oppose them, rather withdrawing the rural population of the country districts within Athens' city walls. Instead, he pursues active naval warfare and reduces any danger from the island of Aegina by replacing its native population with Athenians.
- The Athenian fleet raids the Peloponnese and pilages the area around Methone. The town is saved through an intervention by the Spartan general Brasidas. The Athenians then sail on laying waste to the coastal areas of the western Peloponnese.

==== Roman Republic ====
- The Romans defeat the Aequi and the Volsci at the Battle of Mount Algidus.

=== By topic ===
==== Science ====
- The Greek philosopher Empedocles distinguishes the four elements - earth, fire, water, and air - that he claims all substances are made of. He explains the development of the universe by the forces of attraction and repulsion known as Love and Strife.

==== Literature ====
- Euripides' play Medea wins third prize at the Dionysia, the famous Athenian dramatic festival.

== Births ==
- Xenophon, Athenian Greek mercenary and writer (d. c. 354 BC)

== Deaths ==
- Phidias returns to Athens, where he is imprisoned (for having been portrayed on the shield of the statue of the goddess Athena) and dies before the trial.
