= 350 BC =

350 BC in various calendars
- Gregorian calendar: 350 BC; CCCL BC
- Ab urbe condita: 404
- Ancient Egypt era: XXX dynasty, 31
- Pharaoh: Nectanebo II, 11
- Ancient Greek Olympiad (summer): 107th Olympiad, year 3
- Assyrian calendar: 4401
- Balinese saka calendar: N/A
- Bengali calendar: −943 – −942
- Berber calendar: 601
- Buddhist calendar: 195
- Burmese calendar: −987
- Byzantine calendar: 5159–5160
- Chinese calendar: 庚午年 (Metal Horse); 2348 or 2141 — to — 辛未年 (Metal Goat); 2349 or 2142
- Coptic calendar: −633 – −632
- Discordian calendar: 817
- Ethiopian calendar: −357 – −356
- Hebrew calendar: 3411–3412
- Hindu calendars
- Vikram Samvat: −293 – −292
- Shaka Samvat: N/A
- Kali Yuga: 2751–2752
- Holocene calendar: 9651
- Iranian calendar: 971 BP – 970 BP
- Islamic calendar: 1001 BH – 1000 BH
- Javanese calendar: N/A
- Julian calendar: N/A
- Korean calendar: 1984
- Minguo calendar: 2261 before ROC 民前2261年
- Nanakshahi calendar: −1817
- Thai solar calendar: 193–194
- Tibetan calendar: ལྕགས་ཕོ་རྟ་ལོ་ (male Iron-Horse) −223 or −604 or −1376 — to — ལྕགས་མོ་ལུག་ལོ་ (female Iron-Sheep) −222 or −603 or −1375

Year 350 BC was a year of the pre-Julian Roman calendar. At the time it was known as the Year of the Consulship of Laenas and Scipio (or, less frequently, year 404 Ab urbe condita). The denomination 350 BC for this year has been used since the early medieval period, when the Anno Domini calendar era became the prevalent method in Europe for naming years.

== Events ==
=== By place ===
==== Persian Empire ====
- Sidon, the centre of the revolt against Persia, seeks help from its sister city of Tyre and from Egypt but gets very little.
- Idrieus, the second son of Hecatomnus, succeeds to the throne of Caria on the death of Artemisia II, the widow of his elder brother Mausolus. Shortly after his accession, at the request of the Persian king, Artaxerxes III, Idrieus equips a fleet of 40 triremes and assembles an army of 8,000 mercenary troops and despatches them against Cyprus, under the command of the Athenian general Phocion.

==== Greece ====
- Alexander I becomes king of Epirus after his brother-in-law, Philip II of Macedon, aids him in ousting the previous king, Arymbas.
- Philip II has Abdera in Thrace sacked.

==== Roman Republic ====
- The Gauls, once more threatening Rome, are decisively beaten by an army comprising Rome and its allies.

=== By topic ===
==== Science ====
- Aristotle argues for a spherical Earth using lunar eclipses and other observations. Also he discusses logical reasoning in Organon.
- Plato proposes a geocentric model of the universe with the stars rotating on a fixed celestial sphere.

==== Art ====
- Praxiteles makes the Aphrodite of Knidos (approximate date). A composite of two similar Roman copies after the original marble is now kept at Musei Vaticani, Museo Pio Clementino, Gabinetto delle Maschere in Rome.
- The building of the Mausoleum in Halicarnassus (modern Bodrum in Turkey) is completed (approximate date). It is the grave of the Persian satrap and Carian ruler Mausolos and is built under the direction of his wife Artemisia. The mausoleum, which is considered to be one of the Seven Wonders of the Ancient World, is today partly preserved at the British Museum in London.
- The Corinthian capital is made in the tholos at Epidaurus. It is now preserved at the Archaeological Museum in Epidaurus, Greece (approximate date).

== Births ==
- Dicaearchus, Greek philosopher, cartographer, geographer, mathematician and polymath (d. c. 285 BC)
- Megasthenes, Greek historian, diplomat and Indian ethnographer (approximate date)
- Shen Dao, Chinese philosopher known for his blend of Legalism and Taoism (approximate date) (d. c. 275 BC)

== Deaths ==
- Archytas, Greek philosopher, mathematician and statesman (or 347 BC) (b. 428 BC)
- Artemisia II, queen of Caria and sister and wife of king Mausolus of Caria
- Tollund Man, human sacrifice victim on the Jutland peninsula in Denmark, possibly the earliest known evidence for worship of the Norse god Odin (approximate date)
