= 408 BC =

408 BC in various calendars
Gregorian calendar	408 BC; CDVIII BC
Ab urbe condita	346
Ancient Egypt era	XXVII dynasty, 118
Pharaoh	Darius II of Persia, 16
Ancient Greek Olympiad (summer)	93rd Olympiad (victor)¹
Assyrian calendar	4343
Balinese saka calendar	N/A
Bengali calendar	−1001 – −1000
Berber calendar	543
Buddhist calendar	137
Burmese calendar	−1045
Byzantine calendar	5101–5102
Chinese calendar	壬申年 (Water Monkey); 2290 or 2083 — to — 癸酉年 (Water Rooster); 2291 or 2084
Coptic calendar	−691 – −690
Discordian calendar	759
Ethiopian calendar	−415 – −414
Hebrew calendar	3353–3354
- Hindu calendars
Vikram Samvat	−351 – −350
Shaka Samvat	N/A
Kali Yuga	2693–2694
Holocene calendar	9593
Iranian calendar	1029 BP – 1028 BP
Islamic calendar	1061 BH – 1060 BH
Javanese calendar	N/A
Julian calendar	N/A
Korean calendar	1926
Minguo calendar	2319 before ROC 民前2319年
Nanakshahi calendar	−1875
Thai solar calendar	135–136
Tibetan calendar	ཆུ་ཕོ་སྤྲེ་ལོ་ (male Water-Monkey) −281 or −662 or −1434 — to — ཆུ་མོ་བྱ་ལོ་ (female Water-Bird) −280 or −661 or −1433

Year 408 BC was a year of the pre-Julian Roman calendar. At the time, it was known as the Year of the Tribunate of Iullus, Ahala and Cossus (or, less frequently, year 346 Ab urbe condita). The denomination 408 BC for this year has been used since the early medieval period, when the Anno Domini calendar era became the prevalent method in Europe for naming years.

== Events ==
=== By place ===
==== Persian Empire ====
- King Darius II of Persia decides to continue the war against Athens and give support to the Spartans. His wife, Parysatis, persuades him to appoint his younger son, Cyrus, as satrap (governor) of Lydia, Phrygia, and Cappadocia and commander in chief of the Achaemenian forces in Asia Minor in place of Tissaphernes.
- Tissaphernes' influence is limited to the satrapy of Caria. Darius II also gives Cyrus funds to re-create the Spartan fleet and sends him to Sardis with instructions to increase Persian support for Sparta. Cyrus begins to collect an army of mercenaries (including Greeks) for his own ends.

==== Greece ====
- Alcibiades enters Athens in triumph after an absence of 7 years. He leads the religious procession from Athens to Eleusis, thus atoning for his alleged impiety in 415 BC when he was held to have joined in profaning the Sacred Mysteries. Alcibiades is appointed commander-in-chief with autocratic powers and leaves for Samos to rejoin his fleet.
- The Spartan admiral Lysander arrives at Ephesus in autumn and builds up a great fleet with help from the new Persian satrap, Cyrus.
- At the Panhellenic gathering at Olympia, the philosopher Gorgias speaks out against the Spartan alliance with Persia.
- In 408 BC, the three city-states of the island of Rhodes (Ialysos, Kamiros, Lindos) unite and create the homonymous city on the northernmost part of the island.

=== By topic ===
==== Literature ====
- Euripides' plays Orestes and The Phoenician Women are performed. Euripides then leaves Athens in dissatisfaction and travels to the court of Archelaus I of Macedon at the King's invitation.

== Births ==
- Eudoxus of Cnidus, Greek astronomer, mathematician, physician, scholar and adherent of Pythagoras (d. c. 355 BC)
- Dion, tyrant of Syracuse (d. c. 354 BC)

== Deaths ==
- Hippodamus of Miletus, Greek urban planner and polymath (b. 498 BC)
