= 346 BC =

346 BC in various calendars
Gregorian calendar	346 BC; CCCXLVI BC
Ab urbe condita	408
Ancient Egypt era	XXX dynasty, 35
Pharaoh	Nectanebo II, 15
Ancient Greek Olympiad (summer)	108th Olympiad, year 3
Assyrian calendar	4405
Balinese saka calendar	N/A
Bengali calendar	−939 – −938
Berber calendar	605
Buddhist calendar	199
Burmese calendar	−983
Byzantine calendar	5163–5164
Chinese calendar	甲戌年 (Wood Dog); 2352 or 2145 — to — 乙亥年 (Wood Pig); 2353 or 2146
Coptic calendar	−629 – −628
Discordian calendar	821
Ethiopian calendar	−353 – −352
Hebrew calendar	3415–3416
- Hindu calendars
Vikram Samvat	−289 – −288
Shaka Samvat	N/A
Kali Yuga	2755–2756
Holocene calendar	9655
Iranian calendar	967 BP – 966 BP
Islamic calendar	997 BH – 996 BH
Javanese calendar	N/A
Julian calendar	N/A
Korean calendar	1988
Minguo calendar	2257 before ROC 民前2257年
Nanakshahi calendar	−1813
Thai solar calendar	197–198
Tibetan calendar	阳木狗年 (male Wood-Dog) −219 or −600 or −1372 — to — 阴木猪年 (female Wood-Pig) −218 or −599 or −1371

Year 346 BC was a year of the pre-Julian Roman calendar. At the time it was known as the Year of the Consulship of Corvus and Visolus (or, less frequently, year 408 Ab urbe condita). The denomination 346 BC for this year has been used since the early medieval period, when the Anno Domini calendar era became the prevalent method in Europe for naming years.

== Events ==
=== By place ===
==== Greece ====
- The Peace of Philocrates is signed between Macedonia and Athens. The document agrees to a return to the status quo, but Philip II of Macedon keeps the right to punish the Phocians for starting the Sacred War.
- The Athenian politicians, Demosthenes and Timarchus, prepare to prosecute Aeschines for treason after he has sought to reconcile the Athenians to Macedonia's expansion into Greece. Eubulus loses his influence on Athenian affairs.
- Demosthenes, though condemning the terms of the Peace of Philocrates, argues that it has to be honoured.
- Following the conclusion of the Peace of Philocrates, Philip II's army moves through the pass of Thermopylae and subdues Phocis. Athens makes no move to support the Phocians.

==== Sicily ====
- Dionysius II is restored to power in Syracuse.
