= SAIS =

SAIS, SAIs or Sais may refer to:

== SAIS ==
- School of Advanced International Studies, a school under the Johns Hopkins University
- Sharjah American International School, in Sharjah, United Arab Emirates
- South African Institute of Stockbrokers
- Stamford American International School, located in Singapore
- Strange Adventures in Infinite Space, a 2002 computer game

== SAIs ==
- Supreme audit institutions

== Sais ==
- Sais (genus), a genus of butterflies in the family Nymphalidae
- Sais (company) (Società anonima italo-svizzera per la produzione degli olii vegetali), a former Swiss producer of vegetable oils and margarine
- Sais, Egypt, an ancient Egyptian city and capital during the 24th, 26th, and 28th dynasties.
- Sais Facula, former name of a crater chain on Ganymede, the largest moon of Jupiter. It is now called Enki Catena.
- Sais, the Welsh language word for an English person
- sais, misspelling of sai, a type of dagger-like weapon (sai in plural form is simply sai)
