= 495 BC =

495 BC in various calendars
- Gregorian calendar: 495 BC; CDXCV BC
- Ab urbe condita: 259
- Ancient Egypt era: XXVII dynasty, 31
- Pharaoh: Darius I of Persia, 27
- Ancient Greek Olympiad (summer): 71st Olympiad, year 2
- Assyrian calendar: 4256
- Balinese saka calendar: N/A
- Bengali calendar: −1088 – −1087
- Berber calendar: 456
- Buddhist calendar: 50
- Burmese calendar: −1132
- Byzantine calendar: 5014–5015
- Chinese calendar: 乙巳年 (Wood Snake); 2203 or 1996 — to — 丙午年 (Fire Horse); 2204 or 1997
- Coptic calendar: −778 – −777
- Discordian calendar: 672
- Ethiopian calendar: −502 – −501
- Hebrew calendar: 3266–3267
- Hindu calendars
- Vikram Samvat: −438 – −437
- Shaka Samvat: N/A
- Kali Yuga: 2606–2607
- Holocene calendar: 9506
- Iranian calendar: 1116 BP – 1115 BP
- Islamic calendar: 1150 BH – 1149 BH
- Javanese calendar: N/A
- Julian calendar: N/A
- Korean calendar: 1839
- Minguo calendar: 2406 before ROC 民前2406年
- Nanakshahi calendar: −1962
- Thai solar calendar: 48–49
- Tibetan calendar: ཤིང་མོ་སྦྲུལ་ལོ་ (female Wood-Snake) −368 or −749 or −1521 — to — མེ་ཕོ་རྟ་ལོ་ (male Fire-Horse) −367 or −748 or −1520

Year 495 BC was a year of the pre-Julian Roman calendar. At the time, it was known as the Year of the Consulship of Sabinus and Priscus (or, less frequently, year 259 Ab urbe condita). The denomination 495 BC for this year has been used since the early medieval period, when the Anno Domini calendar era became the prevalent method in Europe for naming years.

== Events ==
=== Roman Republic ===
- A temple is built on the Circus Maximus, between the Aventine and Palatine hills, in Rome, in honour of the god Mercury and was dedicated on 15 May.
- The number of Roman tribes is increased to 21.
- Additional colonists were sent to the colony at Signia.
- The Volsci launch an invasion against Rome, but are defeated, and in retaliation Rome plunders Suessa Pometia.
- Roman troops defeat an invading force of Sabines.
- Roman troops defeat an army of the Aurunci near the town of Aricia.
- The beginning of discord between the plebs and patricians leading to the first secession of the plebs.

=== China ===
- King Fuchai of Wu ascends to the throne after his father, King Helü of Wu, reigning as the last king of Wu until 473 BC.

== Births ==
- Pericles, Athenian politician (d. 429 BC)

== Deaths ==
- Pythagoras of Samos
- Tarquinius Superbus, former king of Rome died in exile in Cumae
