= 415th =

415th may refer to:

- 415th Bombardment Group, inactive United States Air Force unit
- 415th Flight Test Flight (415 FLTF), squadron of the United States Air Force Reserves
- 415th Tactical Fighter Squadron, inactive United States Air Force unit

== See also ==
- 415 (number)
- 415, the year 415 (CDXV) of the Julian calendar
- 415 BC
