= 285 BC =

285 BC in various calendars
- Gregorian calendar: 285 BC; CCLXXXV BC
- Ab urbe condita: 469
- Ancient Egypt era: XXXIII dynasty, 39
- Pharaoh: Ptolemy I Soter, 39
- Ancient Greek Olympiad (summer): 123rd Olympiad, year 4
- Assyrian calendar: 4466
- Balinese saka calendar: N/A
- Bengali calendar: −878 – −877
- Berber calendar: 666
- Buddhist calendar: 260
- Burmese calendar: −922
- Byzantine calendar: 5224–5225
- Chinese calendar: 乙亥年 (Wood Pig); 2413 or 2206 — to — 丙子年 (Fire Rat); 2414 or 2207
- Coptic calendar: −568 – −567
- Discordian calendar: 882
- Ethiopian calendar: −292 – −291
- Hebrew calendar: 3476–3477
- Hindu calendars
- Vikram Samvat: −228 – −227
- Shaka Samvat: N/A
- Kali Yuga: 2816–2817
- Holocene calendar: 9716
- Iranian calendar: 906 BP – 905 BP
- Islamic calendar: 934 BH – 933 BH
- Javanese calendar: N/A
- Julian calendar: N/A
- Korean calendar: 2049
- Minguo calendar: 2196 before ROC 民前2196年
- Nanakshahi calendar: −1752
- Seleucid era: 27/28 AG
- Thai solar calendar: 258–259
- Tibetan calendar: ཤིང་མོ་ཕག་ལོ་ (female Wood-Boar) −158 or −539 or −1311 — to — མེ་ཕོ་བྱི་བ་ལོ་ (male Fire-Rat) −157 or −538 or −1310

Year 285 BC was a year of the pre-Julian Roman calendar. At the time it was known as the Year of the Consulship of Canina and Lepidus (or, less frequently, year 469 Ab urbe condita). The denomination 285 BC for this year has been used since the early medieval period, when the Anno Domini calendar era became the prevalent method in Europe for naming years.

== Events ==
=== By place ===
==== Egypt ====
- June 26 – Egypt's Ptolemy I Soter abdicates. He is succeeded by his youngest son by his wife Berenice, Ptolemy II Philadelphus, who has been co-regent for three years.
- A 110 metre tall lighthouse on the island of Pharos in Alexandria's harbour is completed and serves as a landmark for ships in the eastern Mediterranean. Built by Sostratus of Cnidus for Ptolemy II of Egypt, it is one of the seven wonders of the ancient world. It is a technological triumph and is the archetype of all lighthouses since. A broad spiral ramp leads to the top, where a fire burns at night.

==== Seleucid Empire ====
- Demetrius Poliorcetes is deserted by his troops and surrenders to Seleucus at Cilicia, where Seleucus keeps him a prisoner.

==== China ====
- The success of Qi has frightened the other states. Under the leadership of Lord Mengchang, who has been exiled in Wei, Qin, Zhao, Han and Yan form an alliance. Yan had normally been a relatively weak ally of Qi and Qi feared little from this quarter. Yan's onslaught under general Yue Yi comes as a devastating surprise. Simultaneously, the other allies attack from the west. Chu declares itself an ally of Qi but contents itself with annexing some territory to its north. Qi's armies are destroyed while the territory of Qi is reduced to the two cities of Ju and Jimo. King Min himself is later captured and executed by his own followers.

== Deaths ==
- Dicaearchus, Greek philosopher, cartographer, geographer, mathematician and author (b. c. 350 BC)
- Theophrastus, Greek philosopher, a native of Eressos in Lesbos, the successor of Aristotle in the Peripatetic school (b. c. 370 BC). 288 B.C. is also given as a potential date of death.
