= 496 BC =

496 BC in various calendars
- Gregorian calendar: 496 BC; CDXCVI BC
- Ab urbe condita: 258
- Ancient Egypt era: XXVII dynasty, 30
- Pharaoh: Darius I of Persia, 26
- Ancient Greek Olympiad (summer): 71st Olympiad (victor)¹
- Assyrian calendar: 4255
- Balinese saka calendar: N/A
- Bengali calendar: −1089 – −1088
- Berber calendar: 455
- Buddhist calendar: 49
- Burmese calendar: −1133
- Byzantine calendar: 5013–5014
- Chinese calendar: 甲辰年 (Wood Dragon); 2202 or 1995 — to — 乙巳年 (Wood Snake); 2203 or 1996
- Coptic calendar: −779 – −778
- Discordian calendar: 671
- Ethiopian calendar: −503 – −502
- Hebrew calendar: 3265–3266
- Hindu calendars
- Vikram Samvat: −439 – −438
- Shaka Samvat: N/A
- Kali Yuga: 2605–2606
- Holocene calendar: 9505
- Iranian calendar: 1117 BP – 1116 BP
- Islamic calendar: 1151 BH – 1150 BH
- Javanese calendar: N/A
- Julian calendar: N/A
- Korean calendar: 1838
- Minguo calendar: 2407 before ROC 民前2407年
- Nanakshahi calendar: −1963
- Thai solar calendar: 47–48
- Tibetan calendar: ཤིང་ཕོ་འབྲུག་ལོ་ (male Wood-Dragon) −369 or −750 or −1522 — to — ཤིང་མོ་སྦྲུལ་ལོ་ (female Wood-Snake) −368 or −749 or −1521

Year 496 BC was a year of the pre-Julian Roman calendar. At the time, it was known as the Year of the Consulship of Albus and Tricostus (or, less frequently, year 258 Ab urbe condita). The denomination 496 BC for this year has been used since the early medieval period, when the Anno Domini calendar era became the prevalent method in Europe for naming years.

== Events ==
=== By place ===
==== Greece ====
- Hipparchos, son of Charmos (a relative of the 6th century BC tyrant Peisistratus), wins the archonship of Athens as leader of the peace party which argues that resistance against the Persians is useless.
- Tisicrates of Kroton wins the stadion race at the 71st Olympic Games.

==== Roman Republic ====
- The former Etruscan King of Rome, Tarquinius Superbus, who had been exiled by the Romans in 509 BC, and his ally Octavius Mamilius, of Tusculum, together with the Latins are defeated by the Roman Republic army in the Battle of Lake Regillus, near Frascati. The outcome of this battle establishes Roman supremacy over the Latins.

==== China ====
- King Goujian of Yue defeats and mortally injures King Helü of Wu

== Births ==
- Sophocles, Athenian dramatist and statesman (d. 406 BC)

== Deaths ==
- Sun Tzu, military philosopher and author of The Art of War (most likely a colloquial date) (b. 544 BC)
- King Helü of Wu, king of the Chinese State of Wu
- Marcus Valerius Volusus and Titus Herminius Aquilinus, both former Roman consuls died at the Battle of Lake Regillus
- Octavius Mamilius, ruler of Tusculum also died at the Battle of Lake Regillus
- Iccus of Epidaurus, Olympic boxer, died while boxing Cleomedes of Astypalaea
