= 460 BC =

460 BC in various calendars
- Gregorian calendar: 460 BC; CDLX BC
- Ab urbe condita: 294
- Ancient Egypt era: XXVII dynasty, 66
- Pharaoh: Artaxerxes I of Persia, 6
- Ancient Greek Olympiad (summer): 80th Olympiad (victor)¹
- Assyrian calendar: 4291
- Balinese saka calendar: N/A
- Bengali calendar: −1053 – −1052
- Berber calendar: 491
- Buddhist calendar: 85
- Burmese calendar: −1097
- Byzantine calendar: 5049–5050
- Chinese calendar: 庚辰年 (Metal Dragon); 2238 or 2031 — to — 辛巳年 (Metal Snake); 2239 or 2032
- Coptic calendar: −743 – −742
- Discordian calendar: 707
- Ethiopian calendar: −467 – −466
- Hebrew calendar: 3301–3302
- Hindu calendars
- Vikram Samvat: −403 – −402
- Shaka Samvat: N/A
- Kali Yuga: 2641–2642
- Holocene calendar: 9541
- Iranian calendar: 1081 BP – 1080 BP
- Islamic calendar: 1114 BH – 1113 BH
- Javanese calendar: N/A
- Julian calendar: N/A
- Korean calendar: 1874
- Minguo calendar: 2371 before ROC 民前2371年
- Nanakshahi calendar: −1927
- Thai solar calendar: 83–84
- Tibetan calendar: ལྕགས་ཕོ་འབྲུག་ལོ་ (male Iron-Dragon) −333 or −714 or −1486 — to — ལྕགས་མོ་སྦྲུལ་ལོ་ (female Iron-Snake) −332 or −713 or −1485

Year 460 BC was a year of the pre-Julian Roman calendar. At the time, it was known as the Year of the Consulship of Poplicola and Sabinus (or, less frequently, year 294 Ab urbe condita). The denomination 460 BC for this year has been used since the early medieval period, when the Anno Domini calendar era became the prevalent method in Europe for naming years.

== Events ==
=== By place ===
==== Persian Empire ====
- Egypt revolts against Persian rule. The Egyptian leader, Inaros, asks Athens for assistance, which is willingly provided as Athens has plans to trade with and colonize Egypt. A force of 200 Athenian triremes, which is campaigning in Cyprus, is immediately ordered to Egypt to render assistance.
- Achaemenes, Persian satrap (governor) of Egypt, is defeated and slain in a battle at Papremis, on the banks of the Nile River, by Egyptian forces.
- The construction of the ceremonial complex of Apadana (the audience hall of Darius I and Xerxes I) in Persepolis is completed.

==== Greece ====
- The First Peloponnesian War breaks out between the Delian League (led by Athens) and a Peloponnesian alliance (led by Sparta), caused in part by Athens' alliance with Megara and Argos and the subsequent reaction of Sparta. The Athenians have built long walls for the Megarans to their port at Nisaea, thereby earning the enmity of Megara's old rival Corinth.
- Argos rises against Sparta. Athens supports Argos and Thessaly. The small force that is sent by Sparta to quell the uprising in Argos is defeated by a joint Athenian and Argos force at Oenoe. (Battle of Oenoe)

==== Roman Republic ====
- Conflicts arise between the Roman patricians and plebeians. There is also a revolt by Rome's slaves. During the revolt, the Campidoglio is held by the slaves for a lengthy period, along with the most important temples of Rome. It is during this revolt that consul Publius Valerius Publicola dies. The revolt only ends with the arrival of an army from Tusculum, led by Tusculan dictator Lucius Mamilius. Meanwhile, Lucius Quinctius Cincinnatus is appointed as consul to replace Publicola.

=== Siculi ===
- Ducetius, a Hellenised leader of the Siculi, an ancient people of Sicily, takes advantage of the confusion that follows the collapse of the tyranny in Syracuse and other Sicilian states. With the support of the Syracusan democracy, he drives out the colonists of the former tyrant Hieron from Catana and restores it to its original inhabitants.

=== By topic ===
==== Arts ====
- Polygnotos of Thasos decorates the Painted Stoa, on the north side of Ancient Agora of Athens (approximate date).
- The construction of a sculpture of a Young Warrior (subsequently found in the sea off Riace, Italy) is begun and completed approximately ten years later. It is now preserved at the Museo Archeologico Nazionale, Reggio Calabria, Italy.
- The sculpture Apollo with battling Lapiths and centaurs is built on the west pediment of the Temple of Zeus in Olympia (approximate date). Only fragments remain and are today preserved at the Archaeological museum in Olympia.
- A metope relief of Athena, Heracles and Atlas are made on a frieze in the Temple of Zeus in Olympia (approximate date). It is now preserved at the Archaeological museum in Olympia.
- A statue of Apollo is cast (approximate date), of which today remains one leg, preserved at the Louvre, and the head, known as the Chatsworth Head, preserved at the British Museum.

== Births ==
- Democritus of Abdera, Greek philosopher (approximate year) (d. 370 BC)
- Hippocrates of Cos, Greek physician (approximate year) (d. 375 BC)

== Deaths ==
- Epicharmus, Greek poet (b. 550 BC)
- Panini, Hindu Indian grammarian (b. 520 BC)
- Themistocles, Athenian politician and naval strategist (b. 525 BC)
- Achaemenes, Persian satrap (governor) of Egypt
- Publius Valerius Publicola, Roman consul
