= Sais (company) =

Swiss edible-oils and margarine company

- Formerly: Società anonima italo-svizzera per la produzione degli olii vegetali
- Company type: Joint-stock company
- Industry: Edible oils and fats
- Founded: 1916 in Horn, Switzerland
- Fate: Merged into Lipton-Sais (1993); absorbed into Unilever Bestfoods (2001)
- Headquarters: Zürich, Switzerland
- Products: Vegetable oils, margarine (Dorina, Planta, Linea)

Sais (Società anonima italo-svizzera per la produzione degli olii vegetali) was a Swiss producer of vegetable oils and margarine.

== History ==
In 1916 a group of entrepreneurs from Horn founded the company Sais to import from Italy the vegetable oils and fats that were lacking during the First World War. Sixty percent of the share capital was subscribed by the Schicht group, based at Aussig in Bohemia; Oleifici Nazionali of Italy; and Jakob Schmidheiny. Sais began with trials in pressing linseed in 1917 and moved its headquarters to Zürich in 1921.

The Schicht group joined Margarine Unie N.V. of the Netherlands in 1928, which became Unilever N.V. in 1929. Sais was always linked by agreements to Astra, a company also belonging to Unilever: in 1963, among other measures, their distribution departments merged and manufacturing was rationalized, with Sais producing the Dorina, Planta, and—from 1987—Linea brands. Sais took over Astra in 1976. The Lipton-Sais merger followed in 1993, and incorporation into Unilever Bestfoods in 2001, when the factory closed. In 2003 the Ticinese company Sabo bought part of the Horn factory from Unilever and produces margarine on its behalf.

== Bibliography ==
- H. U. Michel, Firmengeschichte Sais/Astra, 1991
- Thurgauer Zeitung, 18 June 2003
