= Hippodamus of Miletus =

Greek architect and philosopher (480 – 408 BC)

Hippodamus of Miletus (/hɪˈpɒdəməs/; Greek: Ἱππόδαμος ὁ Μιλήσιος, Hippodamos ho Milesios; c.480–408 BC) was an ancient Greek architect, urban planner, physician, mathematician, meteorologist and philosopher, who is considered to be "the father of European urban planning", and the namesake of the "Hippodamian plan" (grid plan) of city layout, although rectangular city plans were in use by the ancient Greeks as early as the 8th c. BC.

Hippodamus was born in Miletus and lived during the 5th century BC. His father was Euryphon. According to Aristotle, Hippodamus was the first author who wrote upon the theory of government, without any knowledge of practical affairs.

His plans of Greek cities were characterised by order and regularity in contrast to the intricacy and confusion common to cities of that period, even Athens. He is seen as the originator of the idea that a town plan might formally embody and clarify a rational social order. However, as cities were built with orthogonal plans centuries before his birth, he cannot be considered the originator of the concept.

== Personality ==
He is referred to in the works of Aristotle, Stobaeus, Strabo, Hesychius, Photius, and Theano.

He evidently had a reputation as a lover of attention. According to Aristotle's description in Politics, "Some people thought he carried things too far, indeed, with his long hair, expensive ornaments, and the same cheap warm clothing worn winter and summer."

In the treatise On Virtue, Theano (apparently the wife of Pythagoras) told a certain Hippodamus of Thurium (presumably this same man) that her work contains the doctrine of the golden mean.

== Achievements ==
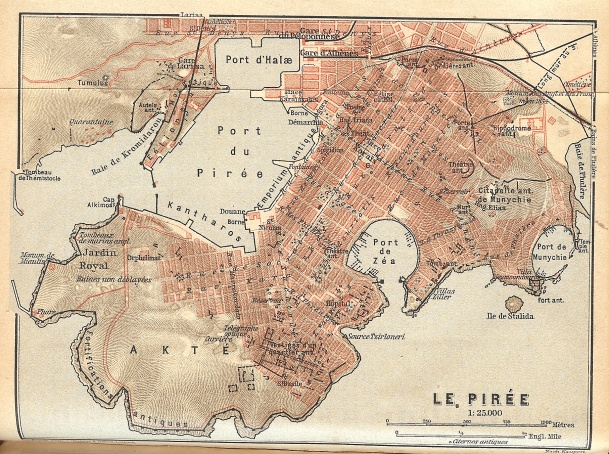
Map of Piraeus, showing the grid plan of the city

=== The "Best State" ===
According to Aristotle (in Politics ii.8), Hippodamus was a pioneer of urban planning, and he devised an ideal city to be inhabited by 10,000 men (free male citizens), while the overall population (including women, children, and slaves) would reach 50,000. He studied the functional problems of cities and linked them to the state administration system. As a result, he divided the citizens into three classes (soldiers, artisans and 'husbandmen'), with the land also divided into three (sacred, public and private).

Aristotle criticized the monopolization of arms-bearing by a single class in Hippodamus' "Best State" writings, arguing that this would lead to oppression of the "farmers" and the "workers" by the arms-bearing class. Aristotle's own concept of polity included a large middle class in which each citizen fulfilled all three functions of self-legislation, arms bearing, and working."

=== Urban planner ===
According to Aristotle, he was the first urban planner to focus attention to proper arrangements of cities. He laid out the Piraeus (the port of Athens) for Pericles, with wide streets radiating from the central Agora, which was generally called the Hippodameia (Ἱπποδάμεια) in his honour, and built the refounded city of Rhodes in the form of a theater. In 440 BC he went out among the Athenian colonists and planned the new city of Thurium (later Thurii), in Magna Graecia, with streets crossing at right angles; as a consequence he is sometimes referred to as Hippodamus of Thurium. His principles were later adopted in many important cities, such as Halicarnassus, Alexandria and Antioch.

Strabo credited the architect of Piraeus with the layout of the new city of Rhodes in 408 BC; however, as Hippodamus was involved in 479 BC with helping the reconstruction of Miletus he would have been very old when this project took place.

The grid plans attributed to him consisted of series of broad, straight streets, cutting one another at right angles. In Miletus we can find the prototype plan of Hippodamus. What is most impressive in his plan is a wide central area, which was kept unsettled according to his macro-scale urban prediction/estimation and in time evolved to the "Agora", the centre of both the city and the society.

=== Writings ===
The Urban Planning Study for Piraeus (451 BC), which is considered to be a work of Hippodamus, formed the planning standards of that era and was used in many cities of the classical epoch. According to this study, neighbourhoods of around 2,400 m^{2} blocks were constructed where small groups of 2-floor houses were built. The houses were lined up with walls separating them while the main facets were towards the south. The same study uses polynomial formulas for the pumping infrastructure manufacture.

== Philosophy ==
From Hippodamus came the earliest notions of patent law. Hippodamus proposed that society should reward those individuals who create things useful for society. Aristotle criticized the practical utilitarian approach of Hippodamus and implicated the inherent tension in rewarding individuals for doing good; i.e. that by rewarding individuals for doing good, the individuals will do good for the reward over the benefit of the state. The state could actually suffer because of the allure of individual rewards, since individuals may propose notions that weaken the state. Aristotle essentially foreshadowed the inherent tension between private rewards for social benefits - the potential diversion between individual and societal interests. Aristotle's greatest criticism of Hippodamus, however, is that rewarding individuals "who discover something advantageous for the city ... is not safe, though it sounds appealing." For while innovation is of great benefit to the arts and sciences, "change in an art is not like change in law; for law has no strength with respect to obedience apart from habit, and this is not created except over a period of time. Hence the easy alteration of existing laws in favour of new and different ones weakens the power of law itself."

Hippodamus does not seem to have been involved in politics, but several writings attributed to him dealt with issues of the state, including Περί Πολιτείας (On the State), Περί Ευδαιμονίας (On Happiness), Πυθαγορίζουσαι Θεωρίαι (Pythagoras Theorems).
