= 372 BC =

372 BC in various calendars
Gregorian calendar	372 BC; CCCLXXII BC
Ab urbe condita	382
Ancient Egypt era	XXX dynasty, 9
Pharaoh	Nectanebo I, 9
Ancient Greek Olympiad (summer)	102nd Olympiad (victor)¹
Assyrian calendar	4379
Balinese saka calendar	N/A
Bengali calendar	−965 – −964
Berber calendar	579
Buddhist calendar	173
Burmese calendar	−1009
Byzantine calendar	5137–5138
Chinese calendar	戊申年 (Earth Monkey); 2326 or 2119 — to — 己酉年 (Earth Rooster); 2327 or 2120
Coptic calendar	−655 – −654
Discordian calendar	795
Ethiopian calendar	−379 – −378
Hebrew calendar	3389–3390
- Hindu calendars
Vikram Samvat	−315 – −314
Shaka Samvat	N/A
Kali Yuga	2729–2730
Holocene calendar	9629
Iranian calendar	993 BP – 992 BP
Islamic calendar	1024 BH – 1022 BH
Javanese calendar	N/A
Julian calendar	N/A
Korean calendar	1962
Minguo calendar	2283 before ROC 民前2283年
Nanakshahi calendar	−1839
Thai solar calendar	171–172
Tibetan calendar	ས་ཕོ་སྤྲེ་ལོ་ (male Earth-Monkey) −245 or −626 or −1398 — to — ས་མོ་བྱ་ལོ་ (female Earth-Bird) −244 or −625 or −1397

Year 372 BC was a year of the pre-Julian Roman calendar. At the time, it was known as the Fourth year without Tribunate or Consulship (or, less frequently, year 382 Ab urbe condita). The denomination 372 BC for this year has been used since the early medieval period, when the Anno Domini calendar era became the prevalent method in Europe for naming years.

== Events ==
=== By place ===
==== Greece ====
- Jason of Pherae, the ruler of Thessaly, allies himself first with Athens and then with Macedon.

=== By topic ===
==== Sports ====
- Troilus of Elis wins two equestrian events at the Olympic Games, which leads to referees being banned from competing in the Games.

== Births ==
- Mencius, Chinese philosopher (d. c. 289 BC)
