= 428 BC =

428 BC in various calendars
Gregorian calendar	428 BC; CDXXVIII BC
Ab urbe condita	326
Ancient Egypt era	XXVII dynasty, 98
Pharaoh	Artaxerxes I of Persia, 38
Ancient Greek Olympiad (summer)	88th Olympiad (victor)¹
Assyrian calendar	4323
Balinese saka calendar	N/A
Bengali calendar	−1021 – −1020
Berber calendar	523
Buddhist calendar	117
Burmese calendar	−1065
Byzantine calendar	5081–5082
Chinese calendar	壬子年 (Water Rat); 2270 or 2063 — to — 癸丑年 (Water Ox); 2271 or 2064
Coptic calendar	−711 – −710
Discordian calendar	739
Ethiopian calendar	−435 – −434
Hebrew calendar	3333–3334
- Hindu calendars
Vikram Samvat	−371 – −370
Shaka Samvat	N/A
Kali Yuga	2673–2674
Holocene calendar	9573
Iranian calendar	1049 BP – 1048 BP
Islamic calendar	1081 BH – 1080 BH
Javanese calendar	N/A
Julian calendar	N/A
Korean calendar	1906
Minguo calendar	2339 before ROC 民前2339年
Nanakshahi calendar	−1895
Thai solar calendar	115–116
Tibetan calendar	阳水鼠年 (male Water-Rat) −301 or −682 or −1454 — to — 阴水牛年 (female Water-Ox) −300 or −681 or −1453

Year 428 BC was a year of the pre-Julian Roman calendar. At the time, it was known as the Year of the Consulship of Cossus and Cincinnatus or Cincinnatus and Atratinus (or, less frequently, year 326 Ab urbe condita). The denomination 428 BC for this year has been used since the early medieval period, when the Anno Domini calendar era became the prevalent method in Europe for naming years.

== Events ==
=== By place ===
==== Greece ====
- The chief city of Lesbos, Mytilene, revolts against Athenian rule. The Spartan admiral, Alcidas, leads 40 Peloponnesian alliance ships with the aim of assisting the inhabitants of Mytilene. However, the rebellion by Mytilene is crushed before his forces can arrive.
- Despite encouragement from the Ionian leaders to engage the Athenians, Alcidas declines. Rather, Alcidas leads his fleet to Cyllene where the Spartans resolve to strengthen the fleet and send it to Corcyra where a revolution has broken out. Spartan leaders, Brasidas and Alcidas, then defeat a fleet of Corcyran ships. However, they retire when word reaches them that 60 Athenian ships from Leucas under the command of Eurymedon have been dispatched to intercept them.

==== Italy ====
- The Greek colony of Cumae in Italy falls to the Samnites, who begin to take control of the Campanian plain.

=== By topic ===
==== Literature ====
- Euripides' play Hippolytus is performed in the Dionysia competition, the famous Athenian dramatic festival. The play is awarded first prize.
- Sophocles writes Oedipus Rex.

== Births ==
- Archytas, Greek philosopher, mathematician, astronomer, statesman, and strategist (d. 347 BC)

== Deaths ==
- Anaxagoras, Greek philosopher (b. c. 500 BC)
