= 354 BC =

354 BC in various calendars
Gregorian calendar	354 BC; CCCLIV BC
Ab urbe condita	400
Ancient Egypt era	XXX dynasty, 27
Pharaoh	Nectanebo II, 7
Ancient Greek Olympiad (summer)	106th Olympiad, year 3
Assyrian calendar	4397
Balinese saka calendar	N/A
Bengali calendar	−947 – −946
Berber calendar	597
Buddhist calendar	191
Burmese calendar	−991
Byzantine calendar	5155–5156
Chinese calendar	丙寅年 (Fire Tiger); 2344 or 2137 — to — 丁卯年 (Fire Rabbit); 2345 or 2138
Coptic calendar	−637 – −636
Discordian calendar	813
Ethiopian calendar	−361 – −360
Hebrew calendar	3407–3408
- Hindu calendars
Vikram Samvat	−297 – −296
Shaka Samvat	N/A
Kali Yuga	2747–2748
Holocene calendar	9647
Iranian calendar	975 BP – 974 BP
Islamic calendar	1005 BH – 1004 BH
Javanese calendar	N/A
Julian calendar	N/A
Korean calendar	1980
Minguo calendar	2265 before ROC 民前2265年
Nanakshahi calendar	−1821
Thai solar calendar	189–190
Tibetan calendar	阳火虎年 (male Fire-Tiger) −227 or −608 or −1380 — to — 阴火兔年 (female Fire-Rabbit) −226 or −607 or −1379

Year 354 BC was a year of the pre-Julian Roman calendar. At the time, it was known as the Year of the Consulship of Ambustus and Crispinus (or, less frequently, year 400 Ab urbe condita). The denomination 354 BC for this year has been used since the early medieval period, when the Anno Domini calendar era became the prevalent method in Europe for naming years.

== Events ==
=== By place ===
==== Greece ====
- Reflecting the growing level of discontent with his tyrannical conduct, Dion is assassinated by Callippus, an Athenian who has accompanied him on his expedition to take over as tyrant of Syracuse. Dionysius II remains in exile in Italy.
- Athens recognises the independence of Chios, Kos and Rhodes and makes peace with Mausolus of Caria.
- The Phocians suffer a defeat in the Sacred War against Athens.
- Philip II of Macedon takes and destroys Methone, a town which has belonged to Athens. During the siege of Methone, Philip loses an eye.

==== Roman Republic ====
- Rome allies itself with the Samnites and they agree on a mutual defence pact.
- Rome defeats the Etruscans of the city of Caere.

==== China ====
- The State of Qi is victorious over the State of Wei in the Battle of Guiling, a conflict which involves the military strategy of Sun Bin.

=== By topic ===
==== Architecture ====
- The Mausoleum at Halicarnassus in Caria, the tomb of King Mausolus and one of the Seven Wonders of the World, is built.

== Births ==
- Hieronymus of Cardia, Greek general and historian (d. 250 BC)

== Deaths ==
- Dion, Greek tyrant of Syracuse (assassinated) (b. c. 408 BC)
- Timotheus, Athenian statesman and general
- Xenophon, Greek historian, soldier, mercenary and an admirer of Socrates (b. c. 431 BC)
