= 348 BC =

348 BC in various calendars
Gregorian calendar	348 BC; CCCXLVIII BC
Ab urbe condita	406
Ancient Egypt era	XXX dynasty, 33
Pharaoh	Nectanebo II, 13
Ancient Greek Olympiad (summer)	108th Olympiad (victor)¹
Assyrian calendar	4403
Balinese saka calendar	N/A
Bengali calendar	−941 – −940
Berber calendar	603
Buddhist calendar	197
Burmese calendar	−985
Byzantine calendar	5161–5162
Chinese calendar	壬申年 (Water Monkey); 2350 or 2143 — to — 癸酉年 (Water Rooster); 2351 or 2144
Coptic calendar	−631 – −630
Discordian calendar	819
Ethiopian calendar	−355 – −354
Hebrew calendar	3413–3414
- Hindu calendars
Vikram Samvat	−291 – −290
Shaka Samvat	N/A
Kali Yuga	2753–2754
Holocene calendar	9653
Iranian calendar	969 BP – 968 BP
Islamic calendar	999 BH – 998 BH
Javanese calendar	N/A
Julian calendar	N/A
Korean calendar	1986
Minguo calendar	2259 before ROC 民前2259年
Nanakshahi calendar	−1815
Thai solar calendar	195–196
Tibetan calendar	阳水猴年 (male Water-Monkey) −221 or −602 or −1374 — to — 阴水鸡年 (female Water-Rooster) −220 or −601 or −1373

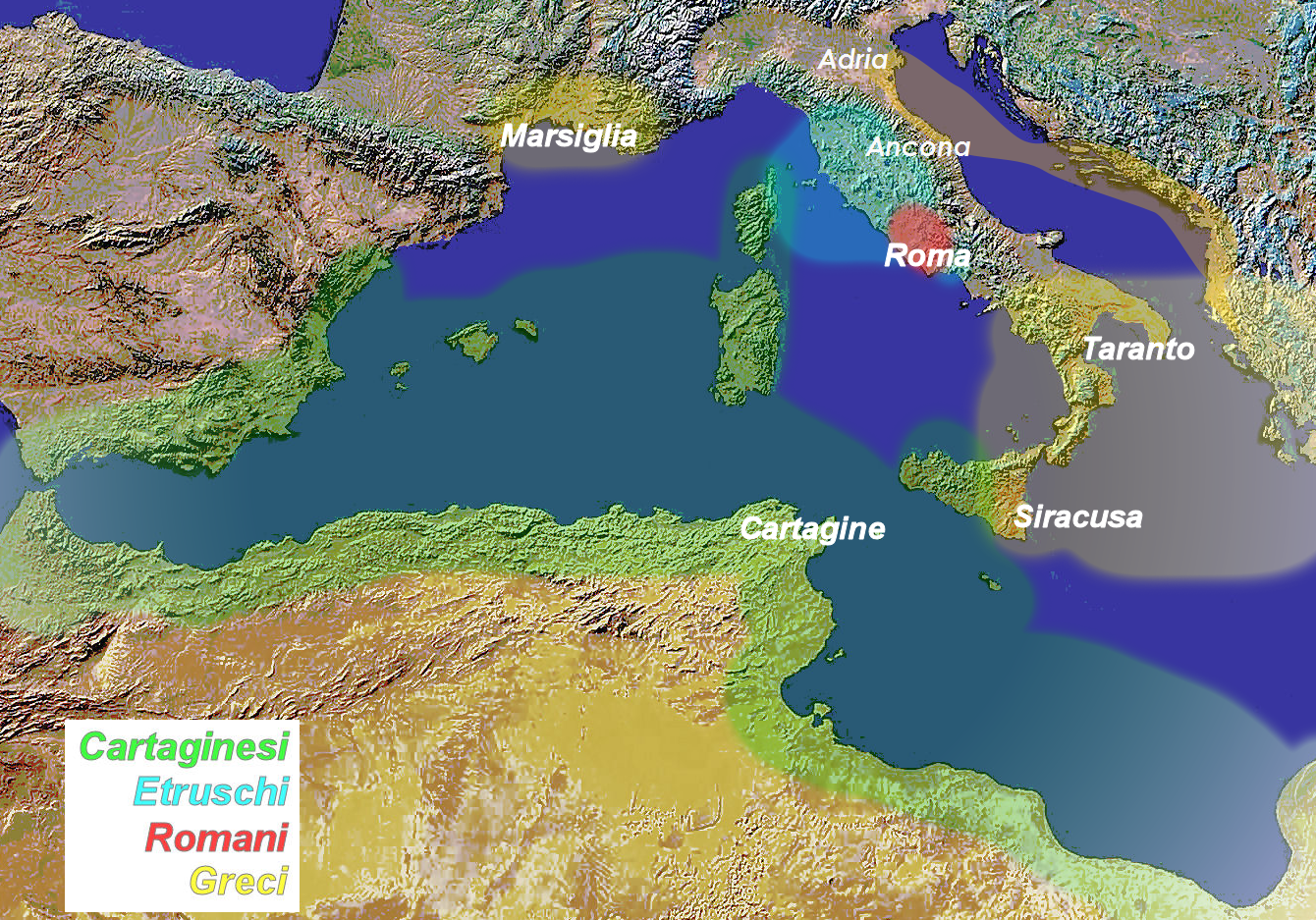
The west Mediterranean in 348 BC.

Year 348 BC was a year of the pre-Julian Roman calendar. At the time it was known as the Year of the Consulship of Corvus and Laenas (or, less frequently, year 406 Ab urbe condita). The denomination 348 BC for this year has been used since the early medieval period, when the Anno Domini calendar era became the prevalent method in Europe for naming years.

== Events ==
=== By place ===
==== Persian Empire ====
- After being besieged by the Persian forces of King Artaxerxes III, Sidon is taken and its population is punished with great cruelty.

==== Greece ====
- The Athenian help to its cities in Macedonia is diverted by a revolt in Euboea which Philip II of Macedon has fomented. He conquers the city of Olynthus in the Chalcidice and he annexes Chalcidice to Macedonia.
- The city of Eretria on the island of Euboea successfully rebels against the rule of Athens and Euboea is declared independent. The Athenian statesman and general, Phocion's tactical skills save an Athenian force sent to fight the supporters of Philip II on Euboea.
- Aristotle leaves Athens and Plato's Academy, after which he resided in Assus in northwestern Anatolia.

==== Roman Republic ====
- Rome and Carthage make a trade agreement under which Carthage will not attack those Latin states which are faithful to Rome. This agreement demonstrates that Rome is now the dominant power in the Latin League.

== Deaths ==
- Plato, Greek philosopher and author
