= 415 BC =

415 BC in various calendars
Gregorian calendar	415 BC; CDXV BC
Ab urbe condita	339
Ancient Egypt era	XXVII dynasty, 111
Pharaoh	Darius II of Persia, 9
Ancient Greek Olympiad (summer)	91st Olympiad, year 2
Assyrian calendar	4336
Balinese saka calendar	N/A
Bengali calendar	−1008 – −1007
Berber calendar	536
Buddhist calendar	130
Burmese calendar	−1052
Byzantine calendar	5094–5095
Chinese calendar	乙丑年 (Wood Ox); 2283 or 2076 — to — 丙寅年 (Fire Tiger); 2284 or 2077
Coptic calendar	−698 – −697
Discordian calendar	752
Ethiopian calendar	−422 – −421
Hebrew calendar	3346–3347
- Hindu calendars
Vikram Samvat	−358 – −357
Shaka Samvat	N/A
Kali Yuga	2686–2687
Holocene calendar	9586
Iranian calendar	1036 BP – 1035 BP
Islamic calendar	1068 BH – 1067 BH
Javanese calendar	N/A
Julian calendar	N/A
Korean calendar	1919
Minguo calendar	2326 before ROC 民前2326年
Nanakshahi calendar	−1882
Thai solar calendar	128–129
Tibetan calendar	ཤིང་མོ་གླང་ལོ་ (female Wood-Ox) −288 or −669 or −1441 — to — མེ་ཕོ་སྟག་ལོ་ (male Fire-Tiger) −287 or −668 or −1440

Year 415 BC was a year of the pre-Julian Roman calendar. At the time, it was known as the Year of the Tribunate of Cossus, Vibulanus, Volusus and Cincinnatus (or, less frequently, year 339 Ab urbe condita). The denomination 415 BC for this year has been used since the early medieval period, when the Anno Domini calendar era became the prevalent method in Europe for naming years.

== Events ==
=== By place ===
==== Greece ====
- Athenian orator and politician, Andocides is imprisoned on suspicion of having taken part in the mutilation of the sacred busts called "Hermae" shortly before the departure of Athens' military expedition to Sicily. These mutilations cause a general panic, and Andocides is induced to turn informer. Andocides' testimony is accepted, and those whom he implicates, including Alcibiades, are condemned to death. Andocides is sent into exile.
- The Athenian expedition to Sicily sets sail under Nicias, Lamachus and Alcibiades. After his departure with the armada, Alcibiades is accused of profanity and is recalled to Athens to stand trial.
- After learning that he has been condemned to death in absentia, Alcibiades defects to Sparta and Nicias is placed in charge of the Sicilian expedition. The Athenian forces land at Dascon near Syracuse but with little result. Hermocrates heads the Syracusan defence.
- Alcibiades openly joins with the Spartans and persuades them to send Gylippus to assist Syracuse and to fortify Decelea in Attica. He also encourages Ionia to revolt against Athens. As a result, a Spartan fleet soon arrives to reinforce their allies in Syracuse and a stalemate ensues.
- Construction of the Temple of Hephaestus in Athens is completed. Construction had begun in 449 BC.

=== By topic ===
==== Drama ====
- Euripides' play The Trojan Women is performed shortly after the massacre by Athenians of the male population of Melos.
