= Inaros =

Inaros may refer to:

== People ==
- Inaros I (fl. c. 665 BC), ancient Egyptian prince
- Inaros II (fl. c. 460 BC), ancient Egyptian prince

== Fictional characters ==
- Marco Inaros and Filip Inaros, fictional characters in The Expanse novel series
- Inaros, a character played by Roger Cudney in the 1988 film Deathstalker and the Warriors from Hell
- Inaros, a playable character in the online game Warframe
