= Lost Army of Cambyses =

524 BC disappearance of a Persian army in Egypt

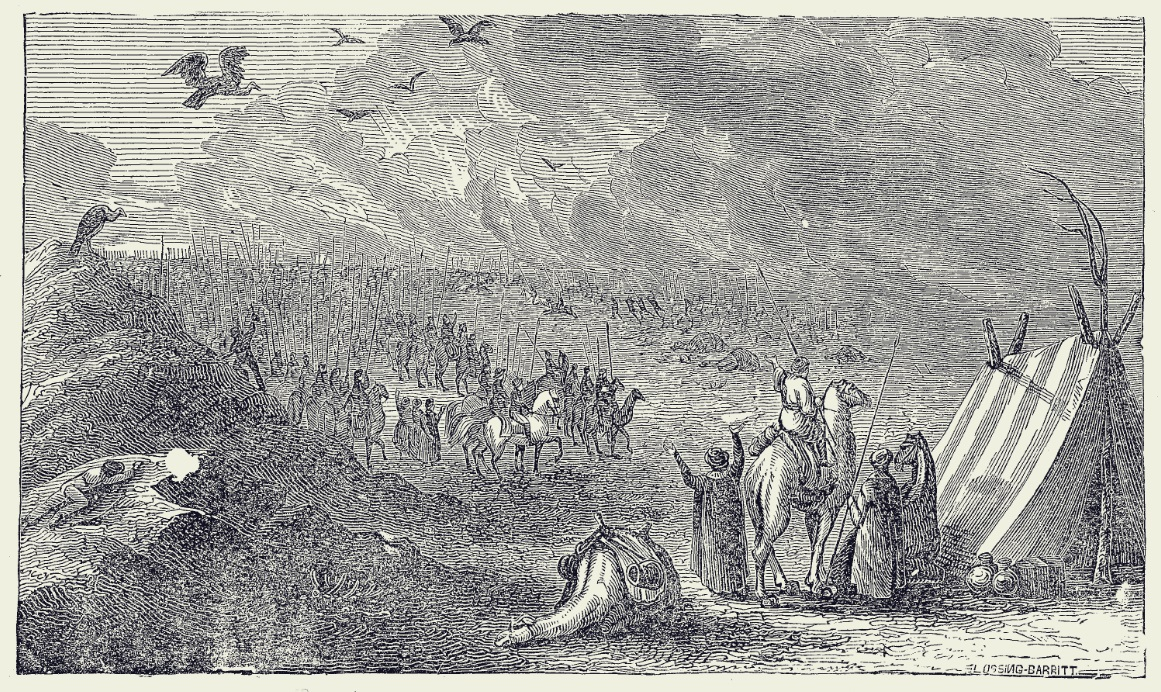
- The Lost Army of Cambyses as imagined by Benson John Lossing and William Barritt.
- Date: c. 525 BC
- Location: Western Desert, Egypt (near Siwa Oasis)
- Participants: Army of Cambyses II (approx. 50,000 Persian soldiers)
- Outcome: Entire force disappeared; fate remains unknown

The Lost Army of Cambyses was, according to an ancient Near Eastern legend, a massive fighting force of 50,000 Persian soldiers that disappeared in the Western Desert of Egypt in 525 BC. They had supposedly been sent by Cambyses II to subjugate the Oracle of Amun at the Siwa Oasis, but were never seen or heard from again after becoming engulfed in a sandstorm. Around this time, Cambyses, who had succeeded Cyrus the Great as the King of Kings of the Achaemenid Empire, was leading the first Persian conquest of Egypt.

== Background ==
According to Herodotus 3.26, the Persian king Cambyses II sent an army of 50,000 men to threaten the Oracle of Amun at the Siwa Oasis around 525 BC. These soldiers had made it halfway across the Western Desert when they were all buried by a catastrophic sandstorm. (Note: [1] As for those who were sent to march against the Ammonians, they set out and journeyed from Thebes with guides; and it is known that they came to the city of Oasis, inhabited by Samians said to be of the Aeschrionian tribe, seven days' march from Thebes across sandy desert; this place is called, in the Greek language, Islands of the Blest. [2] Thus far, it is said, the army came; after that, except for the Ammonians themselves and those who heard from them, no man can say anything of them; for they neither reached the Ammonians nor returned back. [3] But this is what the Ammonians themselves say: when the Persians were crossing the sand from Oasis to attack them, and were about midway between their country and Oasis, while they were breakfasting a great and violent south wind arose, which buried them in the masses of sand which it bore; and so they disappeared from sight. — Herodotus, The Histories 3.26.1-3 (tr. Godley))

Although many Egyptologists regard the story as apocryphal, people have searched for the remains of these legendary Persian soldiers for years, including the Hungarian adventurer László Almásy, on whom the 1992 novel The English Patient is based. In January 1933, the British military officer Orde Wingate searched unsuccessfully for the Lost Army's remains in what was then known as the Libyan Desert.

== Investigations in the 1980s ==
From September 1983 to February 1984, the American journalist and author Gary S. Chafetz led an expedition to search for the Lost Army, having been sponsored by Harvard University, the National Geographic Society, the Egyptian Geological Survey and Mining Authority, and the Ligabue Research Institute. The six-month search was conducted along the Egypt–Libya border, in a remote area of 100 square kilometres (39 sq mi) of complex dunes to the southwest of the uninhabited Bahariya Oasis, approximately 100 miles (160 km) to the southeast of the Siwa Oasis. The US$250,000 expedition had at its disposal 20 Egyptian geologists and labourers, a National Geographic photographer, two Harvard Film Studies documentary film-makers, three camels, an ultra-light aircraft, and ground-penetrating radar. The expedition discovered approximately 500 tumuli but no artifacts. Several tumuli contained bone fragments. Thermoluminescence later dated the fragments to 1500 BC, approximately 1,000 years earlier than the Lost Army. A recumbent winged sphinx carved in oolitic limestone was also discovered in a cave in the uninhabited Sitra Oasis (between Bahariya and Siwa Oases); its provenance appeared to be Persian. Chafetz was arrested when he returned to Cairo in February 1984 for "smuggling an airplane into Egypt" even though he had the written permission of the Egyptian Geological Survey and Mining Authority to bring the aircraft into the country. He was interrogated for 24 hours. The charges were dropped after he promised to "donate" the ultra-light to the Egyptian Government. The aircraft now sits in the Egyptian War Museum in Cairo with a caption that claimed it was from an Israeli spy.

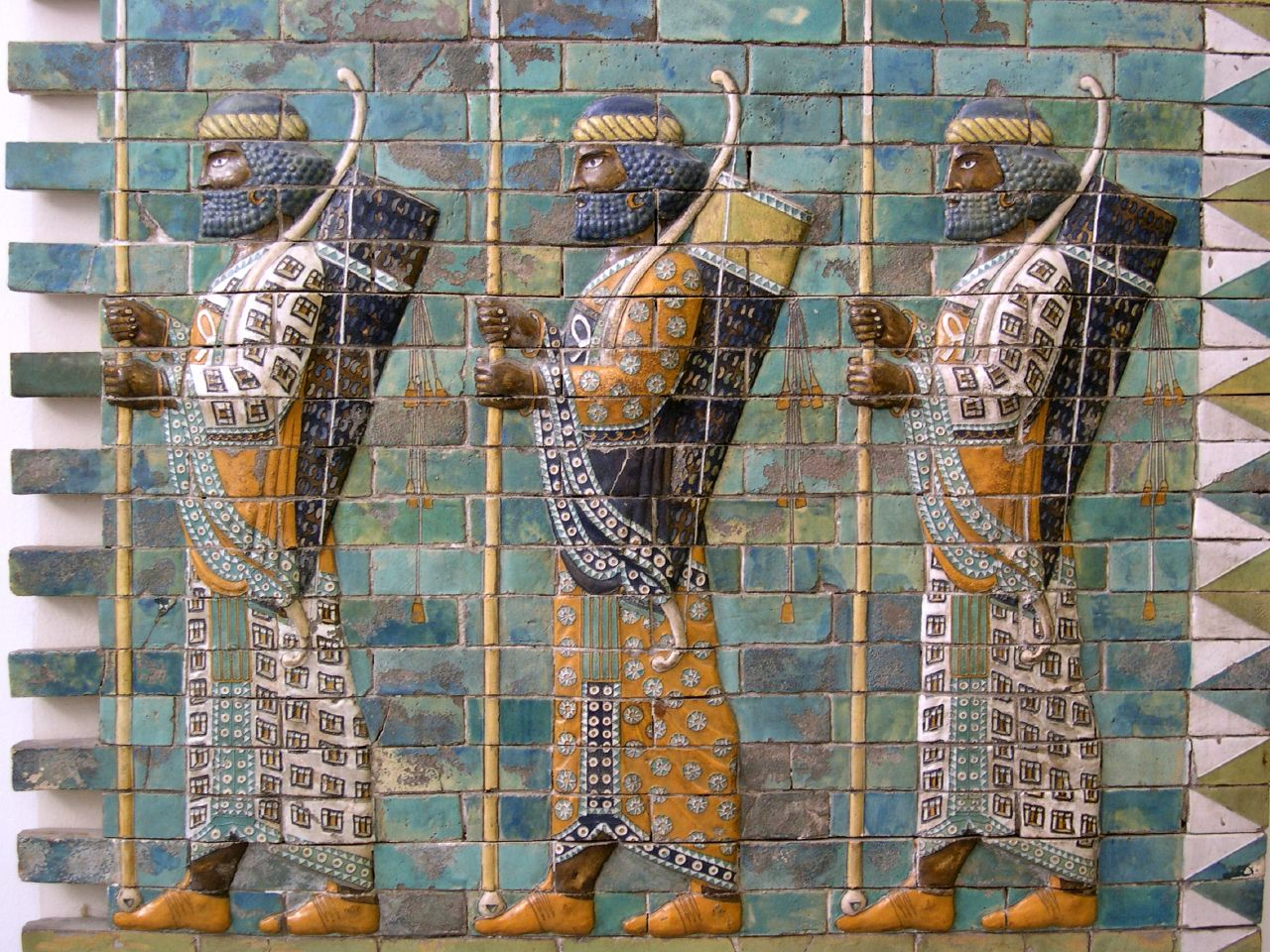
Engraved depictions of Persian soldiers from the Palace of Darius in Susa, now at the Berlin Museum.

== Investigations after 2000 ==
=== Helwan University team findings ===
In the summer of 2000, a Helwan University geological team, prospecting for petroleum in Egypt's Western Desert, came across well-preserved fragments of textiles, bits of metal resembling weapons, and human remains that it believed to be traces of the Lost Army of Cambyses. The Egyptian Supreme Council of Antiquities announced that it would organize an expedition to investigate the site, but released no further information.

=== Angelo and Alfredo Castiglioni ===
In November 2009, two Italian archaeologists, Angelo and Alfredo Castiglioni, announced the discovery of human remains, weapons, a silver bracelet and earrings which date to the era of the Persian army. The artefacts were located near Siwa Oasis. According to these two archaeologists this is the first archaeological evidence of the story reported by Herodotus. While working in the area, the researchers noticed a half-buried pot, some human remains, and what could have been a natural shelter. However, these "two Italian archaeologists" presented their discoveries in a documentary film rather than a scientific journal. Doubts have been raised because the Castiglioni brothers also happen to be the two film-makers who produced five controversial African shockumentaries in the 1970s (including Addio ultimo uomo, Africa ama, and Africa dolce e selvaggia). The Secretary General of the Egyptian Supreme Council of Antiquities, Zahi Hawass, has said in a press release that media reports of the discovery "are unfounded and misleading" and that "The Castiglioni brothers have not been granted permission by the SCA to excavate in Egypt, so anything they claim to find is not to be believed."

=== Petubastis III Dakhla ambush ===
As a result of his excavations at the Dakhla Oasis, in 2015 Olaf E. Kaper of the University of Leiden argued that the Lost Army was not destroyed by a sandstorm, but rather ambushed and defeated by a rebel Egyptian pharaoh, Petubastis III. Petubastis was later defeated by Cambyses' successor Darius the Great, who purportedly invented the sandstorm story in order to remove Petubastis and his rebellion from Egyptian memory.

== Popular culture ==
In Assassin's Creed Origins the Lost Army of Cambyses was found by a scholar just north of Karanis, however, the excavation was abandoned due to the civil war between Cleopatra and Ptolemy and its location was once again lost.

W.E. Johns used the story of the Lost Army in his novel Biggles Flies South. Biggles and his companions search for the army’s remains (and find some mummified warriors) but meet descendants of Persian soldiers still living in an oasis in the Libyan desert.

== See also ==
- List of people who disappeared mysteriously (pre-1910)
