= Zvenigorodsky seal =

Achaemenid cylinder seal

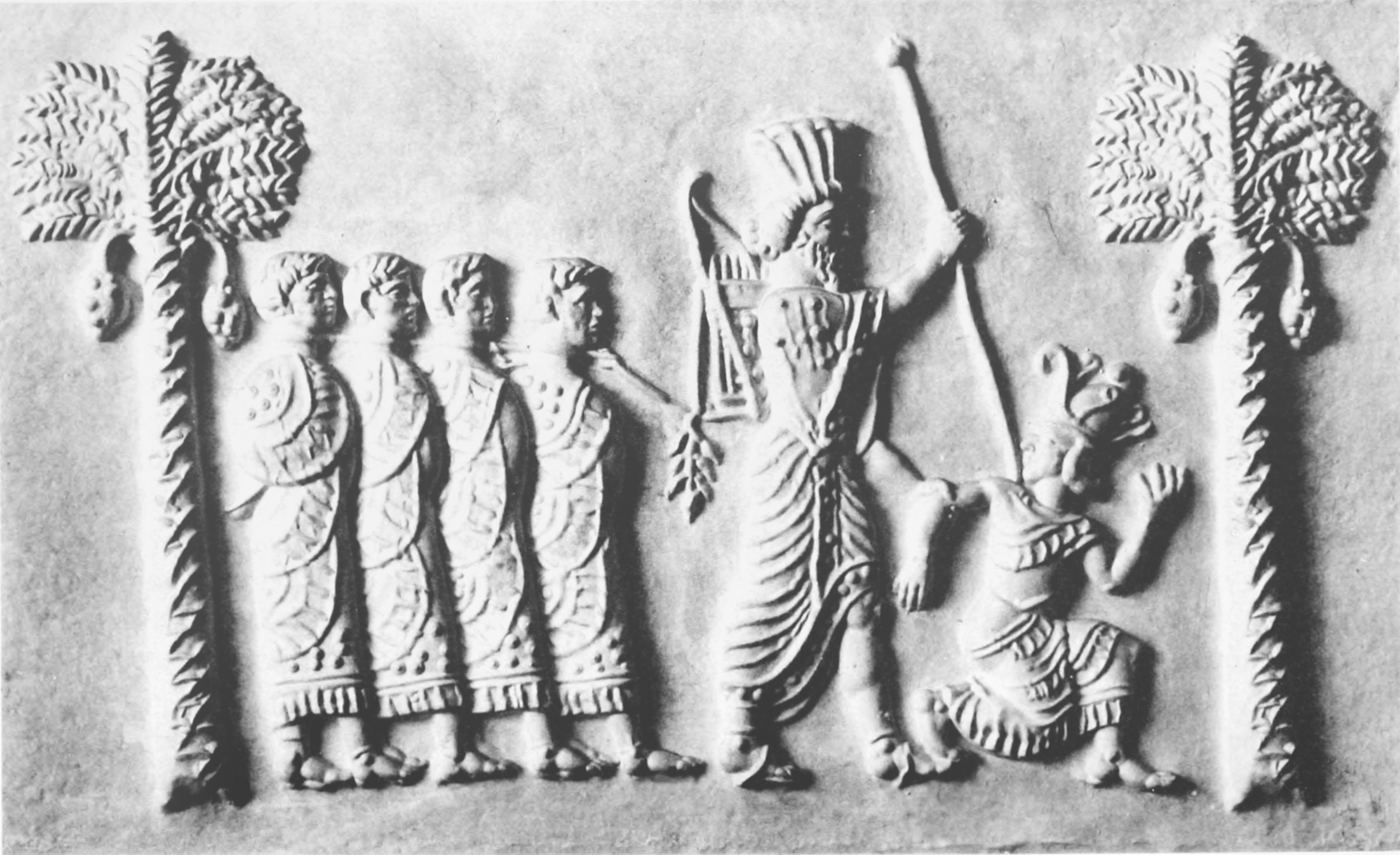
- Photograph of the seal (top), and drawing by Faucher-Gudin of the cylinder’s impression (bottom).

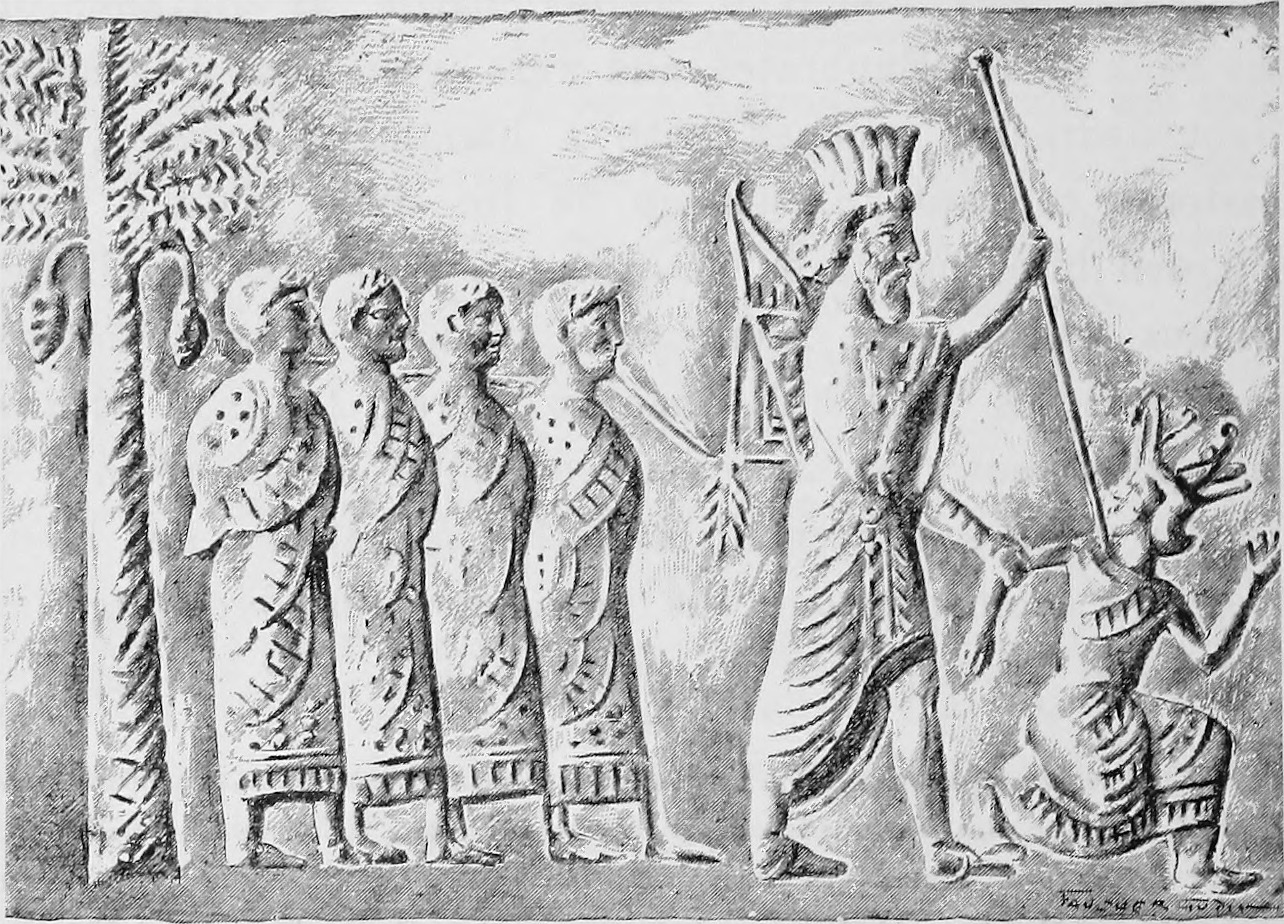
- Material: Chalcedony
- Size: 2.8 cm (1.1 in) x 1.2 cm (0.47 in)
- Created: Late 5th–early 4th century BCE
- Present location: Hermitage Museum
- Identification: Гл-501

The Zvenigorodsky seal, also known as the Persian king and the defeated enemies seal, is an Achaemenid cylinder seal made from chalcedony. It is dated to the late 5th to the early 4th century BCE. In 1930, the Hermitage Museum in Saint Petersburg obtained the seal from a private owner in Kerch (inventory number Гл-501). The seal was first documented in 1881 in Compte rendu de la Commission Impériale Archéologique pour l'Année.

== Content ==
The cylinder depicts an Achaemenid King of Kings subjugating a captive who is wearing a pschent ( an Egyptian double crown). The captive is seen kneeling, held down by the king's hand and in his other hand, a spear. Behind the king there are four prisoners with a rope around their necks, the rope being held by the king. The garments worn by the prisoners are similar to those worn by Egyptian figures in the reliefs of Naqsh-e Rostam. The features suggest the conquest of Ancient Egypt or the suppression of an Egyptian uprising by an Achaemenid king. It is likely the seal depicts a Persian king or hero thrusting his lance into an Egyptian pharaoh, while holding four other captives on a rope.

== Identification ==
Several attempts have been made to identify the main characters on the seal. In 1903, Gaston Maspero suggested that the king is Darius the Great (r. 522–486 BCE) dealing with some rebels. In 1937, Alexander S. Strelkov believed that the scene depicts Artaxerxes I (r. 465–424 BCE) dealing with an Egyptian rebel pharaoh, an opinion shared by Richard Arthur Martin in 1940, who added that the defeated ruler had to be Inaros II. In 1979, Muhammad Dandamayev opined the king was Artaxerxes II (r. 405/4–359/8 BCE). In 1992, Shapur Shahbazi suggested, that the king might have been Artaxerxes III (r. 359/8–338 BCE).

== Comparisons ==
The Metropolitan Museum of Art (Acc. No. 1999.325.114) holds a similar chalcedony cylinder dated to the 6th – 5th century BCE. Again, the figures are unidentified.

The Moscow Artaxerxes cylinder seal is inscribed in Old Persian cuneiform "I am Artaxerxes the Great King". In this image, the Achaemenid king is shown leading Egyptian captives on a rope, but there is no kneeling figure. The king in this case might be Artaxerxes I who repressed a rebellion in Egypt or Artaxerxes III who reconquered Egypt. However, the more rigid execution of the engraving suggests it may date from the time of Darius the Great.

The Zvenigorodsky seal is most similar to that of Darius the Great, both in the rather rigid treatment of the figures, and in the composition of the seal itself. On these grounds, the manufacture of the Zvenigorodsky seal could be attributed to a period rather close to that of Darius, which would favour an attribution to Artaxerxes I.

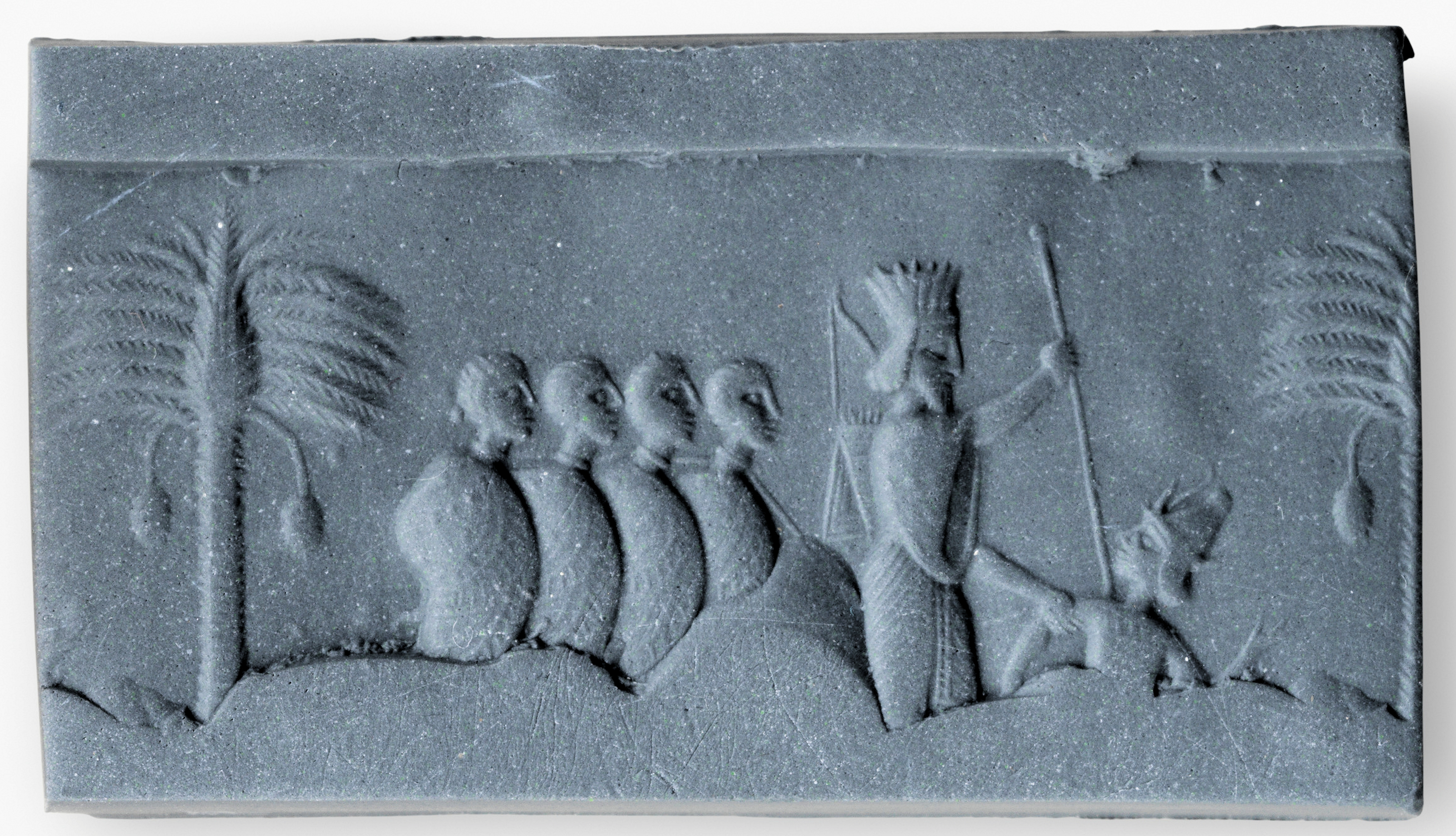
Similar scene from the Metropolitan Museum of Art (Acc. No. 1999.325.114).

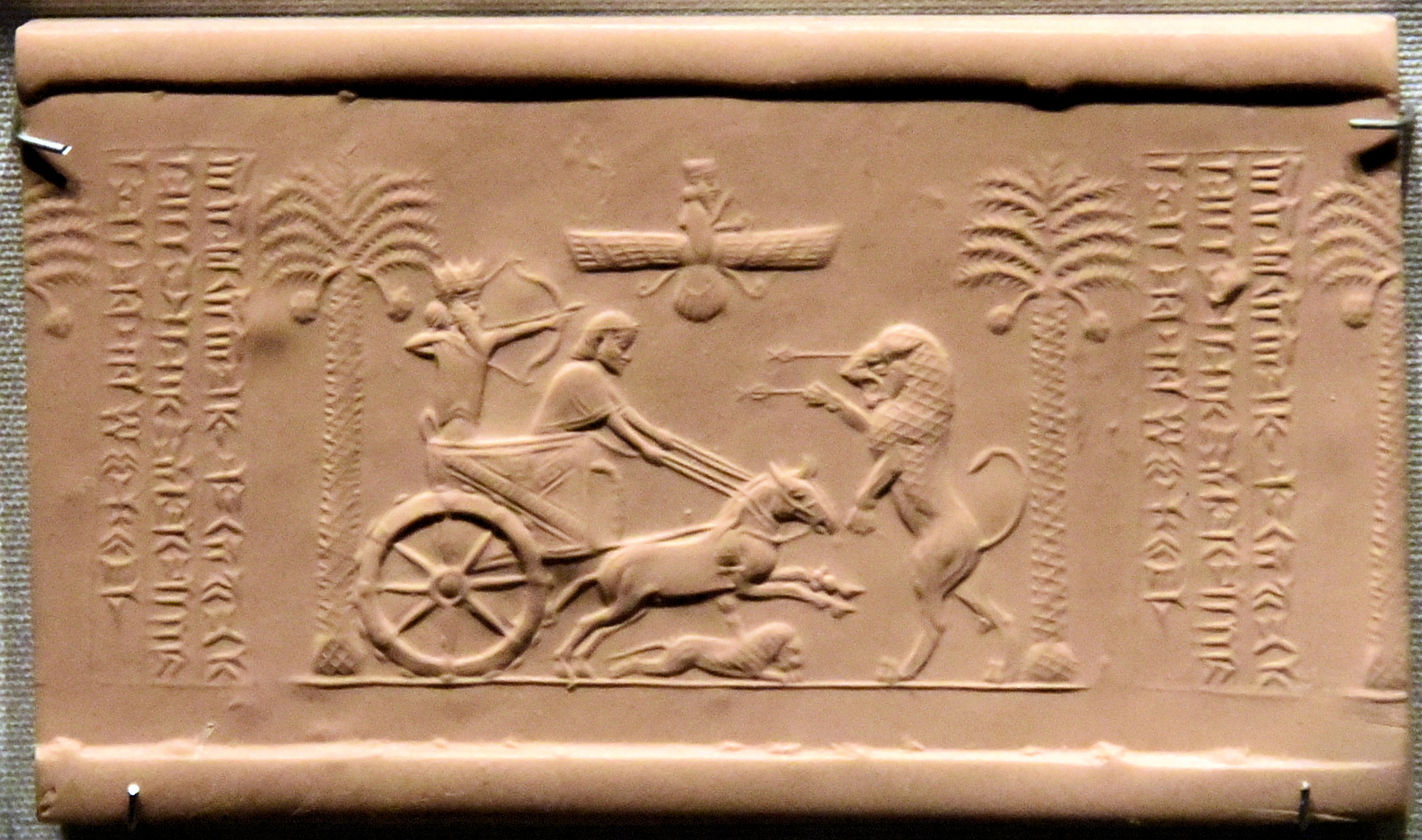
Seal of Darius the Great. British Museum.
