= Inaros II =

5th century BC Egyptian ruler

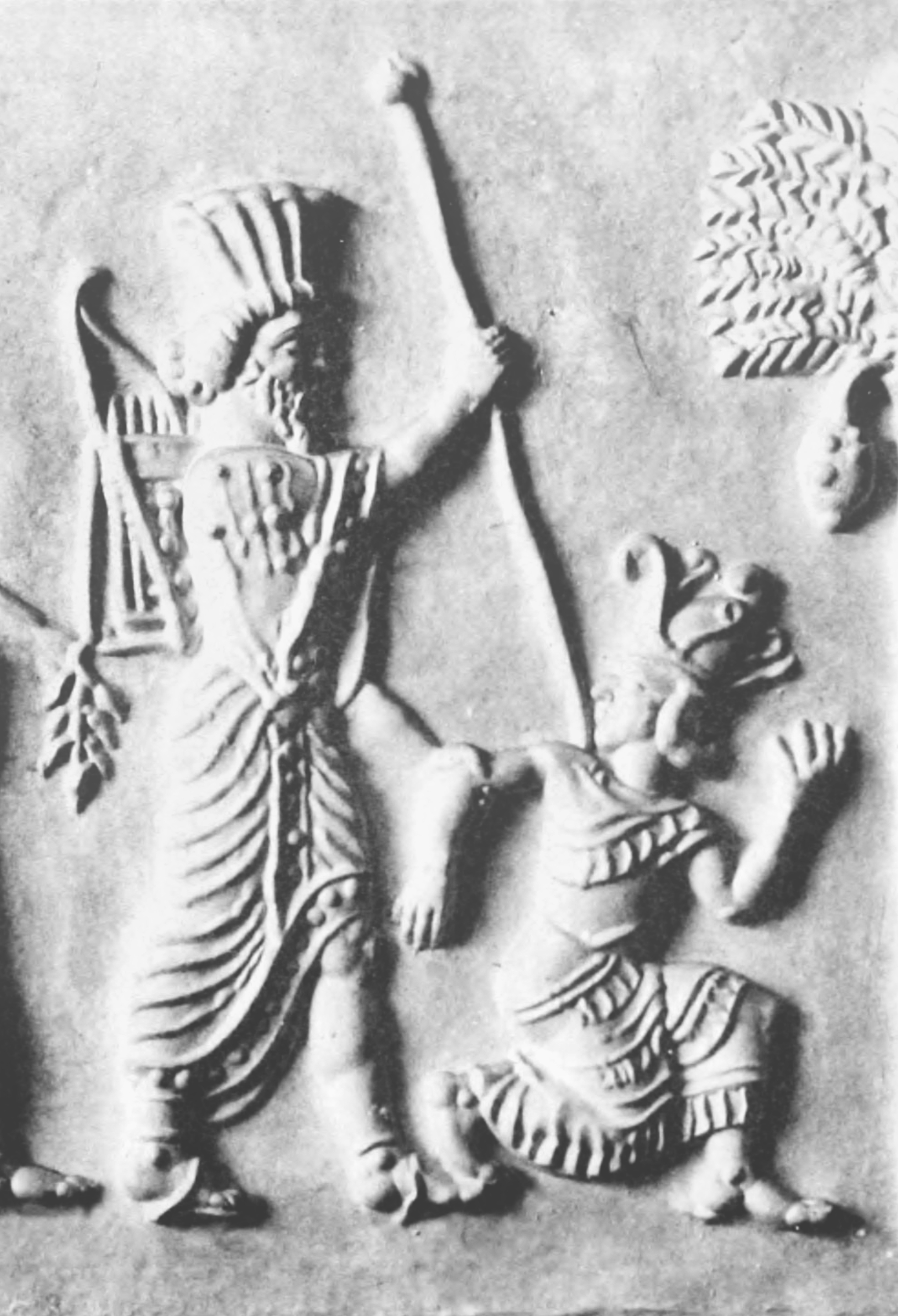
- Closeup of the Zvenigorodsky seal, believed at least by one scholar to depict Artaxerxes I seizing Inaros.

Rebel Pharaoh
- Reign: c. 460 BC
- Predecessor: Psammetichus IV
Royal titulary
- Father: Psammetichus IV
- Died: c. 454 BC; Susa, Persia
- Dynasty: Saite Dynasty

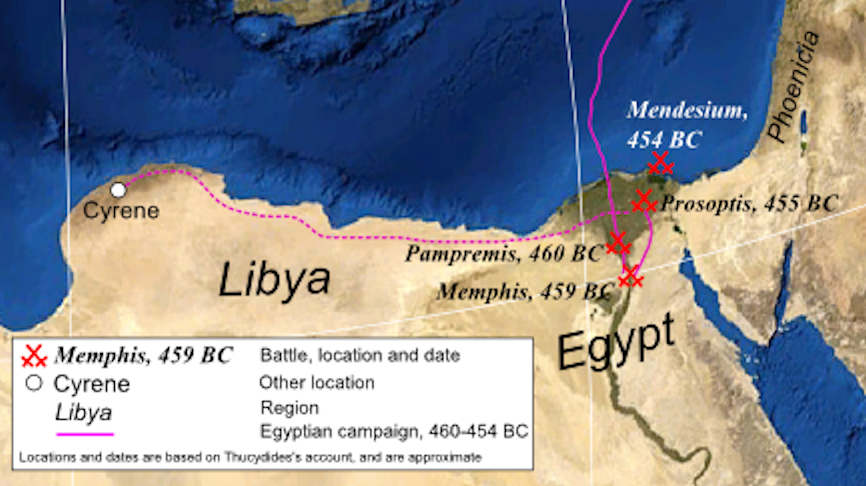
Inaros II fought with the Athenians against the Persian troops in Egypt, and later against Achaemenid satraps Megabyzus and Artabazus, who defeated him.

Inaros (II), also known as Inarus, (fl. c. 460 BC) was an Egyptian rebel ruler who was the son of an Egyptian prince named Psamtik, presumably of the old Saite line, and grandson of Psamtik III. In 460 BC, he revolted against the Persians with the help of his Athenian allies under Admiral Charitimides, and defeated the Persian army commanded by satrap Achaemenes. The Persians retreated to Memphis, but the Athenians were finally defeated in 454 BC by the Persian army led by Megabyzus, satrap of Syria, and Artabazus, satrap of Phrygia, after a two-year siege. Inaros was captured and carried away to Susa where he was reportedly crucified in 454 BC.

== Revolt and aftermath ==
He held a kingship over the Libyans from Mareia (above Pharos) and the part of the Nile Delta around Sais. With help from Amyrtaeus, also from Sais, who took the northern marshes, Inarus drove out the tax-collectors while collecting mercenaries. These actions started a revolt in Egypt at the beginning of the reign of King Artaxerxes I of Persia, following the assassination of king Xerxes I. The Athenian allies from whom he was paid 100 triers, sent troops and an army of more than 200 ships led by Charitimides to aid him in 460 BC.

=== Battle of Papremis (460 BC) ===
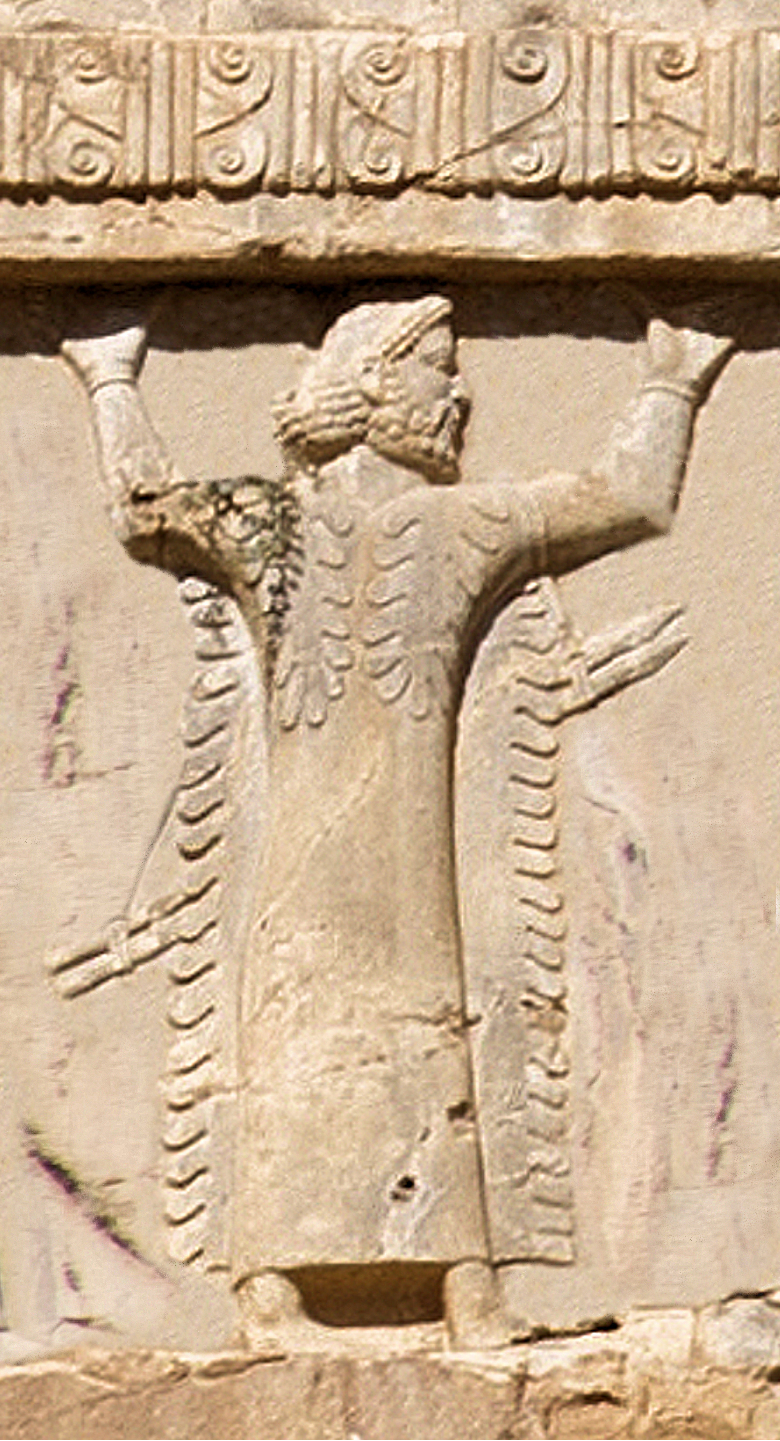
Libyan soldier, circa 470 BC. Xerxes I tomb relief.

Diodorus tells us that once the Athenians had arrived, they and the Egyptians accepted battle from the Persians. The rebel army confronted the Persian army of around 400,000 infantry and eighty ships led by the brother of Artaxerxes, the satrap Achaemenes. At first the Persians' superior numbers gave them the advantage, but eventually the Athenians broke through the Persian line, whereupon the Persian army was routed and fled. However, a portion of the Persian army found refuge in the citadel of Memphis (called the 'White Castle') and could not be dislodged. Thucydides's rather compressed version of these events is: "and making themselves masters of the river and two-thirds of Memphis, addressed themselves to the attack of the remaining third, which is called White Castle". The satrap Achaemenes, together with 100,000 of his 400,000 men was defeated and killed at Papremis and the Persians retreated to Memphis. The commanders of the Athenian fleet, Charitimides and Cimon fought a naval battle with the Persians, in which forty Greek ships engaged fifty Persians ships, of which twenty of the Persian ships were captured with their crews, and the remaining thirty sunk. To show that their victory was complete, the rebels sent the dead body of satrap Achaemenes to the Persian king Artaxerxes I as an admonition.

=== Siege of Memphis (459-455 BC) ===
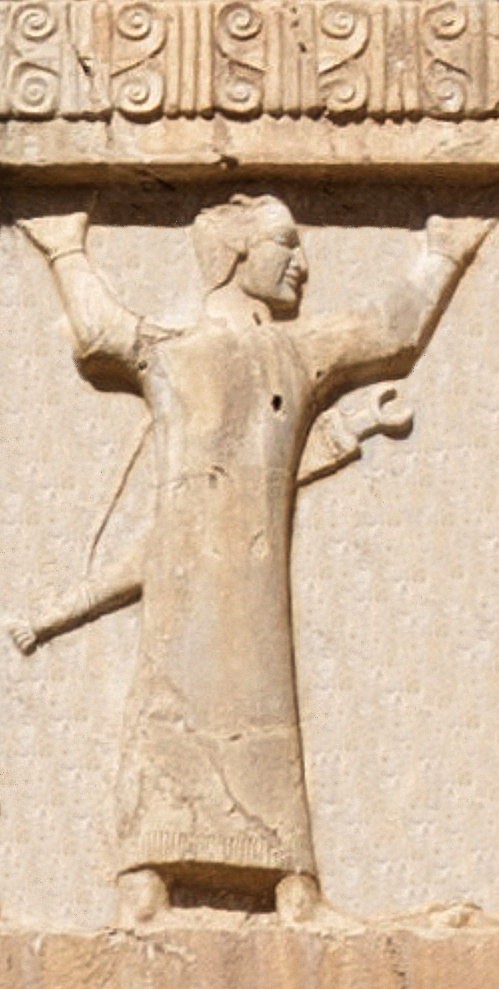
Egyptian soldier, circa 470 BCE. Xerxes I tomb relief.

The Athenians and Egyptians thus settled down to besiege the White Castle. The siege evidently did not progress well, and probably lasted for at least four years, since Thucydides says that their whole expedition lasted 6 years, and of this time the final 18 months was occupied with the Siege of Prosoptis.

According to Thucydides, at first Artaxerxes sent Megabazus to try and bribe the Spartans into invading Attica, to draw off the Athenian forces from Egypt. When this failed, he instead assembled a large army under (confusingly) Megabyzus, and dispatched it to Egypt. Diodorus has more or less the same story, with more detail; after the attempt at bribery failed, Artaxerxes put Megabyzus and Artabazus in charge of 300,000 men, with instructions to quell the revolt. They went first from Persia to Cilicia and gathered a fleet of 300 triremes from the Cilicians, Phoenicians and Cypriots, and spent a year training their men. Then they finally headed to Egypt. Modern estimates, however, place the number of Persian troops at the considerably lower figure of 25,000 men given that it would have been highly impractical to deprive the already strained satrapies of any more man power than that. Thucydides does not mention Artabazus, who is reported by Herodotus to have taken part in the second Persian invasion; Diodorus may be mistaken about his presence in this campaign. It is clearly possible that the Persian forces did spend some prolonged time in training, since it took four years for them to respond to the Egyptian victory at Papremis. Although neither author gives many details, it is clear that when Megabyzus finally arrived in Egypt, he was able to quickly lift the Siege of Memphis, defeating the Egyptians in battle, and driving the Athenians from Memphis.

=== Siege of Prosopitis (455 BCE) ===
The Athenians now fell back to the island of Prosopitis in the Nile delta, where their ships were moored. There, Megabyzus laid siege to them for 18 months, until finally he was able to drain the river from around the island by digging canals, thus "joining the island to the mainland". In Thucydides's account the Persians then crossed over to the former island, and captured it. Only a few of the Athenian force, marching through Libya to Cyrene survived to return to Athens. In Diodorus's version, however, the draining of the river prompted the Egyptians (whom Thucydides does not mention) to defect and surrender to the Persians. The Persians, not wanting to sustain heavy casualties in attacking the Athenians, instead allowed them to depart freely to Cyrene, whence they returned to Athens. Since the defeat of the Egyptian expedition caused a genuine panic in Athens, including the relocation of the Delian treasury to Athens, Thucydides' version is probably more likely to be correct.

=== Battle of Mendesium ===
As a final disastrous coda to the expedition, Thucydides mentions the fate of a squadron of fifty triremes sent to relieve the Siege of Prosopitis. Unaware that the Athenians had finally succumbed, the fleet put in at the Mendesian mouth of the Nile, where it was promptly attacked from the land, and from the sea by the Phoenician navy. Most of the ships were destroyed, with only a handful managing to escape and return to Athens. Total Athenian casualties of the expedition totaled some 50,000 men and 250 ships.

=== Retreat to Byblos and capture ===
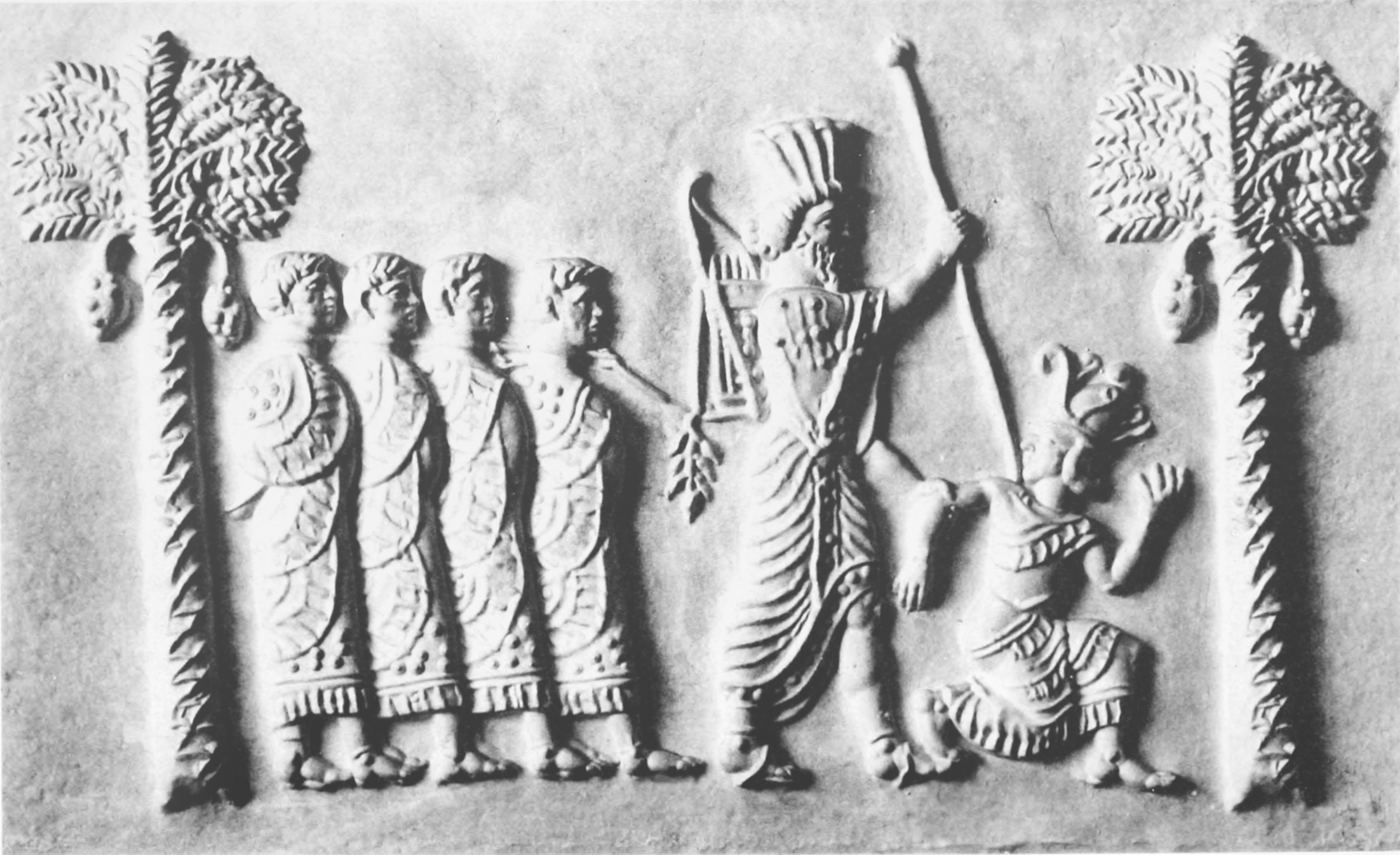
Full impression of the Zvenigorodsky seal. Being devoid of names, the identification of the subjects is a matter of conjecture. In 1940, Richard Arthur Martin suggested that it represents Artaxerxes I seizing Inaros. Several alternative identifications have been suggested.

Charitimides was killed in battle and Inarus was wounded in the thigh by the Persian force and retreated to Byblos, his stronghold and the only Egyptian city that did not submit to Megabyzus. After fighting for a year and a half in the marshes, Inaros was defeated by Megabyzus. Together with the remaining Greeks, he was taken captive away to Susa.

== Execution ==
Megabyzus promised Inaros and his rebel Greeks that they would not be executed once they arrived at Susa, the Persian capital. The Queen Mother Amestris wanted them punished and killed because they were responsible for the death of her son, the satrap Achaemenes, and asked for his death. Artaxerxes I initially refused Amestris' demands and kept the promise made by Megabyzus, allowing them to live in Susa as prisoners of war. But after five years of pleading, with Amestris maintaining her stance, the Greeks attacking Persia at the Battle of Cyprus and Artaxerxes needing support and not wanting to lose the Persian throne at any chance, he reluctantly handed Inaros and fifty Greeks to the Queen Mother.

There are two versions of his death. According to the first he was crucified, and according to the other, impaled. A fragment of Ctesias preserved by Photios I of Constantinople reports that "Inaros was executed on three stakes, fifty of the Greeks, all that she could lay hands on, were decapitated." The Greek word anestaurothe, used to describe and name the method of his execution in the texts could either mean impalement or crucifixion on a single stake, or crucifixion on a true cross, but there is not enough evidence and information in the historical records to give a definitive answer.

Thucydides reports a slightly different story. He records no truces and Professor J M Bigwood argues that Thucydides should be interpreted as saying that Inaros was both captured and executed in the same year, 454 BC.

== Legacy ==
Inaros’s revolt, although unsuccessful in the end, left a significant mark in Egyptian history. Herodotus also reports that Inaros did more damage to the Persians than any man before him.

== Inaros I and II ==
Inaros II is often confused in both ancient and modern literature with his namesake, the Libyan prince Inaros I of Athribis, who rebelled against the Assyrians about two centuries earlier.

== See also ==
- Petubastis III – an earlier Egyptian prince who rebelled against the Achaemenid rule.
