= Inaros I =

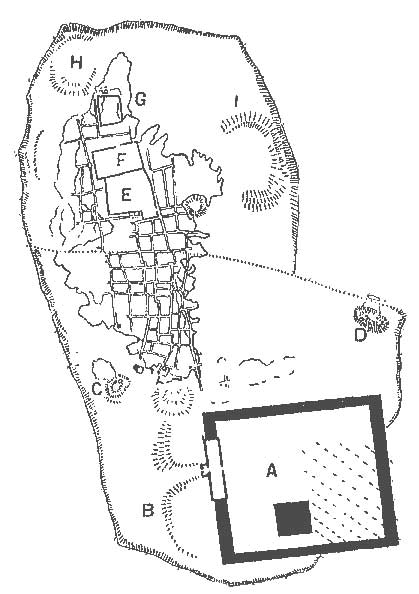
Petrie's sketch plan of the remains of Naucratis from 1885

Inaros I of Athribis (fl. c. 674–657 BC) was an ancient Egyptian prince who rebelled against the Neo-Assyrian Empire during the short-lived Assyrian conquest of Egypt. His struggle against the Assyrians gave rise to a whole cycle known as The Inaros Stories, the latest of which date to the 2nd century, about 750 years after his death.

== Biography ==
Little is known about the historical events surrounding his rebellion, except that he came from a prominent family. He was the son of Prince Bakennefy of Athribis, mentioned in the annals of the Neo-Assyrian emperor Ashurbanipal, and his grandfather was Prince Padiaset of Athribis, who is mentioned on the Stele of Piye.

The Inaros Stories suggests that Inaros and the king of Saïs, Necho I, were involved in a battle in 674 BCE between the Assyrians led by Assarhaddon and the 'Napatheans' led by Taharqa, king of the Kingdom of Kush. Inaros may have played a major role in this battle, which would have helped him gain the profile of a national hero.

In 667/666 BCE, Ashurbanipal invaded Egypt and deported several leaders of Lower Egypt to Nineveh, including apparently Inaros' father, Bakennefy, who was executed there. It may be at this time that he began to rule his territory of Athribis.

Strabo indicates that Psamtik I, then king of Saïs, defeated a certain Inarôs, who was probably Inaros I of Athribis, with the help of Milesian mercenaries. In any case, in the 8th year of his reign (around 657 BCE), Psamtik was pharaoh of Lower Egypt.

== The Inaros Stories ==
The main works identified are The fight of Inaros against the Griffin, the Epic of Inaros against the Assyrians, the Tale of Bes (which takes place during the life of Inaros) and, for those taking place after the death of the hero, the War for the cuirass, the War for the prebend of Amun, King Ounamun and the kingdom of Lihyan and The competition for the diadem and the lance of Inaros.

Inaros I is often confused in both ancient and modern literature with his namesake Inaros II, who rebelled against the Persians about 200 years later.
