= Petubastis III =

Egyptian leader (ruled 522 – 520 BC) who revolted against Persian rule

Seheruibre Padibastet
- Pedubast III, Pedubastis III, Petubastis III
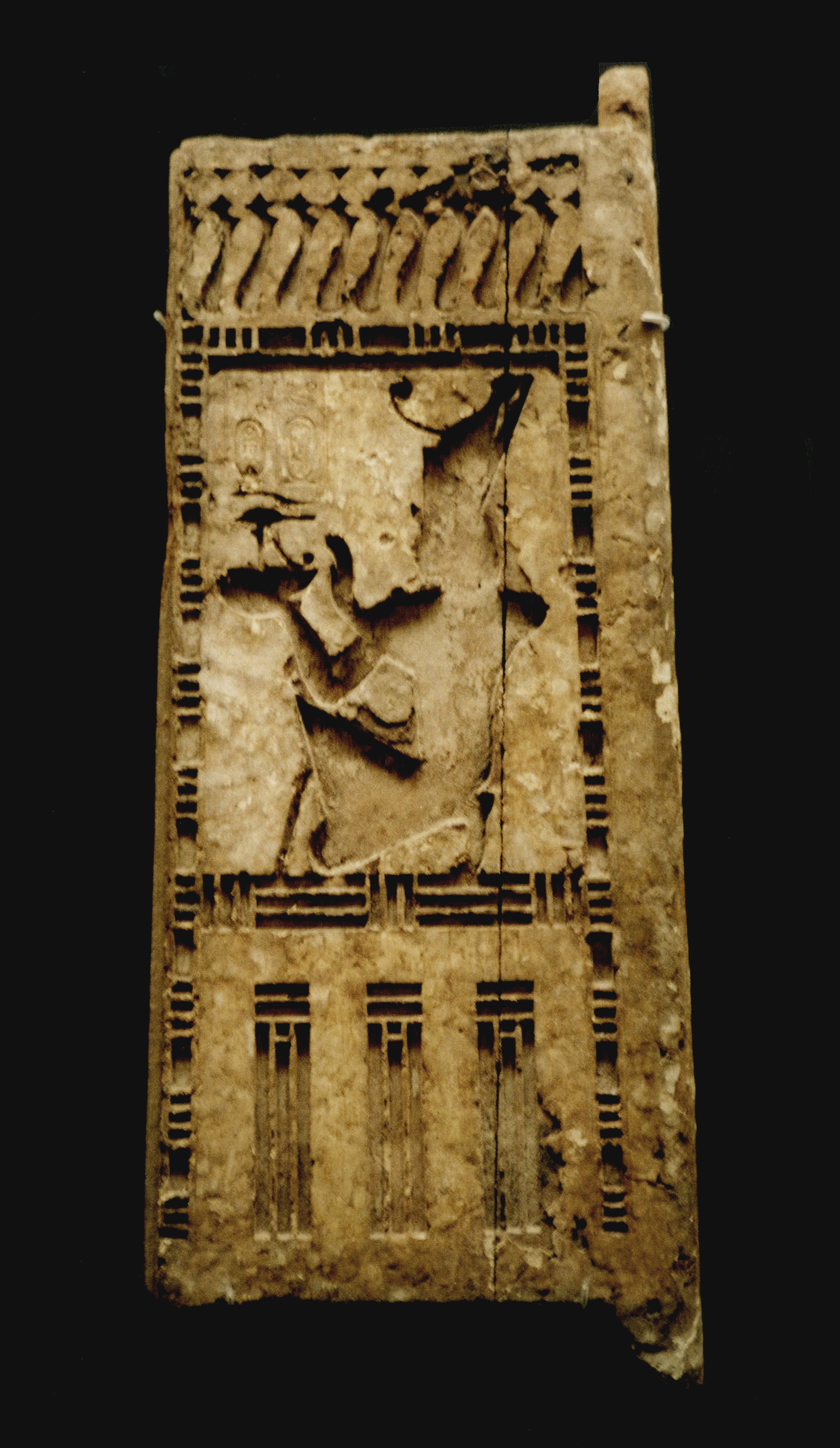
- Wooden doorjamb, originally covered with gold leaf and inlaid glass, representing Seheruibre Petubastis III making an offering, Louvre Museum.

Rebel Pharaoh
- Reign: 522 BC - 520 BC
- Predecessor: Cambyses II
- Successor: Darius I
Royal titulary
Horus name
Sementawy
smn tꜢwy
He who controls the Two Lands
G5	s mn n U32 N17 N17 N21 N21
Nebty name
Sehedj Er-Peru
sḥḏ r-prw
He who illuminates the temples
G16	t H8 s T3 I10 N5 r p pr Z2
Prenomen
Seheruibre
shrw ib rꜥ
Maker of peace in the heart of Ra

M23 X1 L2 X1	N5 z O4 r ib
Nomen
Padibastet
pꜣ-dj-bꜣstt
Given by Bastet

G39 N5	G40 X8 W1 t t
- Dynasty: (?)

Seheruibre Padibastet (Ancient Egyptian: shrw-jb-rꜥ pꜣ-dj-bꜣstt) better known by his Hellenised name Petubastis III (or IV, depending on the scholars) was a native ancient Egyptian ruler (ruled c. 522 – 520 BC), who revolted against Persian rule.

== Biography ==
Petubastis was a local prince, dynast and probably a member of the old royal Saite line who attempted to take control of Egypt and seize power. Although he assumed the royal titles and the titulary of a pharaoh, he has been a largely unknown character and a shadowy figure in Egyptian history.

Recent excavations at Amheida in the Dakhla Oasis have suggested that Petubastis may have had his royal residence there, a location reasonably far from the Nile valley which was under Persian control. Some blocks from the destroyed temple of Thoth at Amheida bear inscriptions attributable to him, as well as his almost complete royal titulary. From Amheida, Petubastis may have ambushed and defeated the so-called "Lost Army of Cambyses", which was described some decades later by Herodotus as a military expedition sent by Cambyses II to the Oracle of Zeus-Ammon in the Siwa Oasis, only to be obliterated by a sand storm.

Shortly after this, Petubastis would have reached Memphis in order to be formally crowned as pharaoh, and adopted a royal titulary resembling those of the previous Saite Dynasty.

Petubastis probably took advantage of the disruption caused by the usurpation by Bardiya of the Persian throne after the death of Cambyses to rebel. According to the 2nd century Greek military author Polyaenus, who wrote about the revolt, it was the oppression and cruelty of the then Persian satrap Aryandes which led to the rebellion.

The Behistun Inscription, which offers the greatest insight into the events during this period, mentions a rebellion in Egypt which occurred at the same time as other rebellions in the eastern parts of the Persian Empire. Darius I, the author of the Behistun Inscription, does not go into any detail about how he dealt with the rebellion in Egypt. Polyaenus reports that Darius moved to Egypt to suppress the revolt, and entered into Memphis during the mourning period for the death of an Apis bull. Cunningly, the Great King promised one hundred talents of gold for the one that would provide a new Apis, impressing the natives to the point that they moved en masse to his side. This story suggests that the rebellion was not yet quelled when Darius came to Egypt.

Petubastis was ultimately defeated by Darius, who later ensured the control of the western oases by embarking on an active campaign of works there (the most famous being the Temple of Hibis at Kharga Oasis). At the same time, he most likely destroyed as much evidence as he could regarding Petubastis and his rebellion, including the temple at Amheida and the true fate of the lost army of Cambyses.

== Attestations ==
Prior to the rediscovery of several blocks referring to him in the Dakhla Oasis, the existence of this shadowy rebel ruler was confirmed by inscriptions found on two seals and one scarab that bear his name written in a royal form inside a cartouche. His figure appears on a door jamb once covered in gold leaf, now at the Louvre Museum, and on a wooden panel now in Bologna (KS 289). There also exists a document that has been dated to 522 BC, which was the first year of his reign.

== See also ==
- Psammetichus IV – a proposed Egyptian ruler who rebelled against the Achaemenid rule in the 480s BC
- Inaros II – another Egyptian ruler who rebelled against the Achaemenid rule in the 460s BC

== Notes ==
Preceded by Cambyses II	Pharaoh of Egypt; Twenty-seventh Dynasty	Succeeded by Darius I
