= Psammetichus IV =

Possible 5th century BCE Egyptian pharaoh

- Psamtik IV

Rebel Pharaoh
- Reign: possibly in the 480s BCE
- Predecessor: uncertain, possibly Darius I
- Successor: uncertain, possibly Xerxes I
Royal titulary
Prenomen
possibly Ahmose or Nebkaenre (Nb-k3-n-Rˁ)
Nomen
Psamtik (Psammetichus)
- Children: Inaros II (?)
- Dynasty: (?)

Psammetichus IV or Psamtik IV is a proposed ancient Egyptian ruler who lived during the First Persian Period.

== Attestations ==
There are several artifacts, as well as Greek sources, supporting the existence of an Egyptian ruler with this name during the Persian period. The archaeological findings bearing this name consists in a sistrum handle, which also give a throne name Amasis (Ahmose), a scarab with the throne name Nb-k3-n-Rˁ, an ushabti, and a Demotic document from Diospolis Parva (papyrus Straßburg 2), dating to a regnal year 2, while Greek authors give several times the name of this ruler. However, the difference of both dating and naming of these attestations makes their attributions to an individual ruler virtually impossible.

== Identification ==
In 1980, the American Egyptologist Eugene Cruz-Uribe first proposed that the aforementioned papyrus Straßburg 2 from Diospolis Parva, traditionally attributed to Psammetichus III, is in fact more recent and refers to a ruler with the same name whom he called “Psammetichus IV”. According to Cruz-Uribe, this ruler most likely reigned over part of Egypt around the 480s BCE: within this decade it is known through Herodotus that a revolt occurred in Egypt in conjunction with the last years of Darius I and the rise of Xerxes I, who, once crowned, promptly suppressed the rebels.

Anthony Spalinger believed that Cruz-Uribe's attribution was “too tentative”, and agreed that Psammetichus IV was the same person as Inaros II's father, mentioned by Herodotus as a Libyan. According to Greek sources, Inaros was a “king of the Libyans” who led a large, well-known revolt against the Persians in the 460s BCE. Assuming that this identification is correct, it appears that this Psammetichus did not have enough authority to claim the Egyptian throne. For this reason, Spalinger believes that the aforementioned archaeological findings may rather belong to a subsequent ruler with the same name: the Athenian historian Philochorus reports that a Psammetichus (V) – who probably was a great-grandson of Psammetichus IV for likely being the son of Thannyros, himself son of Inaros II – shipped grains to Athens in 445/4 BCE. Finally, Diodorus Siculus mentions a Psammetichus (VI) as a king of Egypt in 400 BCE, saying that he was a “descendant of the famous Psammetichus”. However, the name of this Psammetichus VI is sometimes considered a mistake for Amyrtaeus, the pharaoh of the 28th Dynasty who ruled from 404 to 399 BCE.

== See also ==
- Petubastis III – another Egyptian rebel ruler during the First Persian Period.
