= Prexaspes =

Persian minister, counselor to Cambyses II (d. 522 BCE)

Prexaspes (Greek: Πρηξάσπης, romanized: Prēxáspēs, Old Iranian: *Para.wakhsh.aspa-) was a prominent Persian during the reign of Cambyses II (r. 530–522 BC), the second King of Kings of the Achaemenid Persian Empire. According to Herodotus, when Cambyses ordered his trusted counselor Prexaspes to kill Bardiya (also known as Smerdis), the King's own brother, Prexaspes loyally carried out his order. Herodotus provides two versions of the murder. After moving from Egypt (where he was stationed) to Susa, Prexaspes either killed Bardiya in a hunting field near Susa, or drowned him in the Erythrean Sea.

After Cambyses' death, Prexaspes denied murdering Bardiya at first, but ultimately, in the words of Brill's New Pauly, "revealed before the assembled Persians the usurpation by the Magi (Patizeithes), called for their overthrow and committed suicide (Hdt. 3,66 ff.; 74 ff.)."

== Name ==
The original Iranian form of the Hellenized personal name Prexaspes is not attested in the Indo-Iranian languages, and there is no Old Iranian word that corresponds to the Greek Πρηξ- (/prēk^{(h)}s/). Since the mid-19th century, numerous scholarly endeavors have aimed to link the name documented by Herodotus to Old Iranian languages. A recent linguistic study published in 2024 identifies Prexaspes as the Ionic Greek representation of the Old Iranian Bahuvrihi compound *Para.wakhsh.aspa, which translates to "one who possesses a croup (-high) horse." .

== Sources ==
- Dandamayev, M. A. (1988). "BARDIYA". Encyclopaedia Iranica, Vol. III, Fasc. 8. pp. 785–786.
- Wiesehöfer, Josef (2006). "Prexaspes". In Salazar, Christine F.; Landfester, Manfred; Gentry, Francis G. (eds.). Brill's New Pauly. Brill Online.
