= Pictorial carpet =

Carpet design

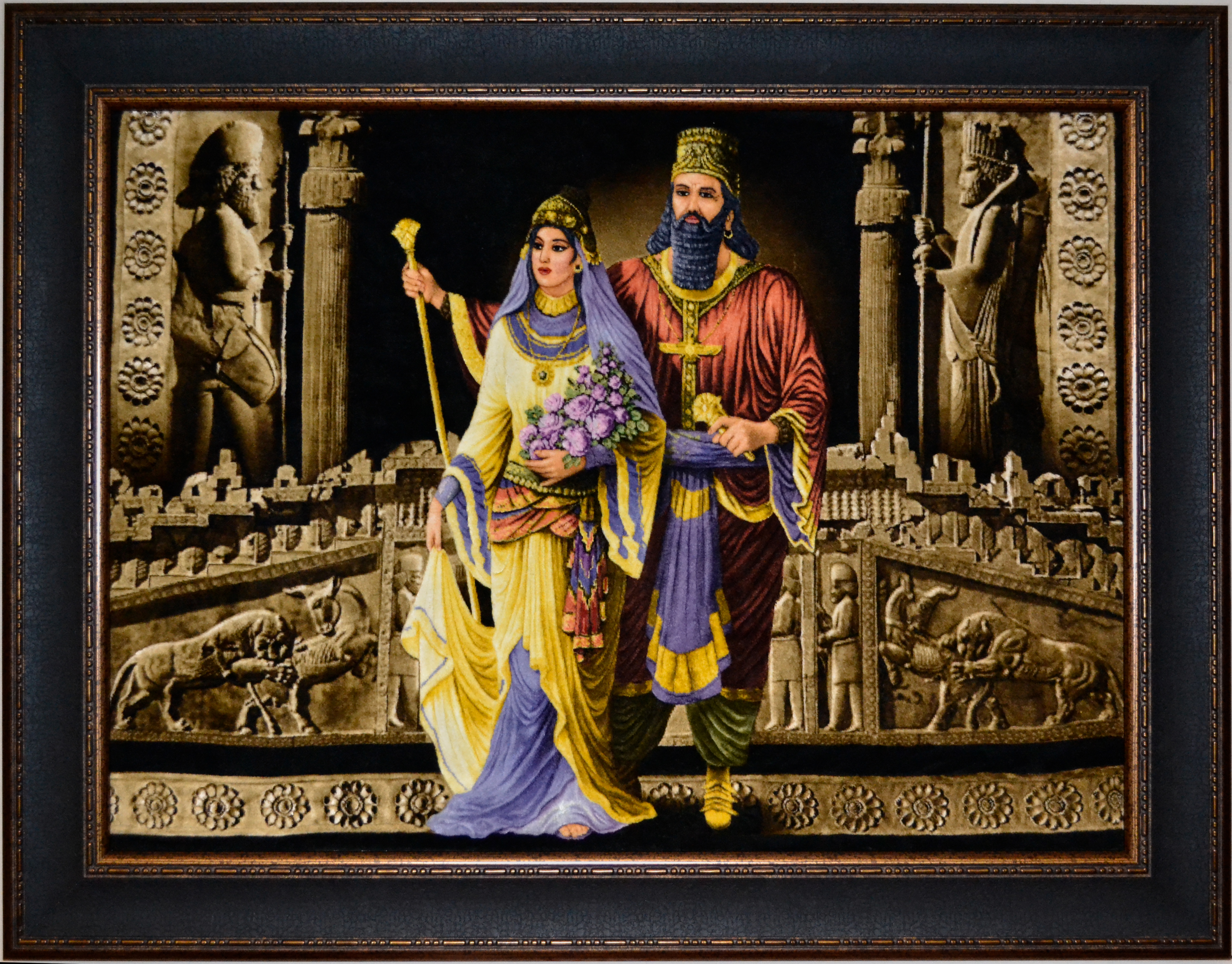
A pictorial carpet of Cyrus the Great and Cassandane in Apadana Palace

A pictorial carpet, picture carpet, tableau rug, carpet tableau or rug tableau (Persian: تابلو فرش) is an ornamental rug specially prepared for hanging on room and hall walls for decoration. Unlike common floor rugs, pictorial carpets are often framed and differ in their design. Pictorial carpets are generally made of silk but have also been made from wool.

== Description ==
The very concept and expectations of Persian rugs slowly started to change over the past 25 years. The original tableau rug, also known as pictorial carpet is not known when it was weaved together but some of the old rugs back in 19th & 20th century show that the similar type design were used such as hunting scene in Isfahan or Qum carpet as well as floral design in Isfahan and Tabriz carpet.

Also picturesque scenes from ancient Persia showing the king and his wife is another example. After the 1979 revolution in Iran, the whole industry started to change and many of the original patterns which were famous in Iran were exported to many countries which they have started producing similar products with much lower quality such as China, Turkish, Afghanistan, India etc. and unfortunately selling them in the global market known as Persian design carpets. This have hurt the industry significantly which the export of the Persian rugs has been reducing year by year after the revolution. At the same time a new trend slowly started to take shape as part of the Persian rug culture and Iranian came to a conclusion since they are best known carpet weaver and the oldest known carpet maker in the world & modern society, why not to re-produce some of the most famous, well known and rare art works from across the globe in the new product known as “tableau rug”. What is known is that now this is a new trend in the ancient world of Persian rug.

Pictorial carpets are being woven exactly the same way as the Persian rug has been made over the past 2500 years so there is no different in quality. The main different is that in pictorial carpet, there is not the ancient design and it always has a picture or scenery that are much more colorful with many different scenes. They can be framed the same way as an art work or painting and they are designed to be hung on the wall.

== Themes ==
- Scenery
- People & faces
- Animal
- Statues & Figurines
- Flowers
- French Style
- Persian Miniature
- Religious Theme
- Persepolis (Pasargad) Theme

== See also ==
- Tabriz carpet
