= Otanes =

Several individuals who appear in the Histories of Herodotus

Otanes (Old Persian: Utāna, Ancient Greek: Ὀτάνης) is a name given to several figures that appear in the Histories of Herodotus. One or more of these figures may be the same person.

== In the Histories ==
=== Otanes, son of Pharnaspes ===
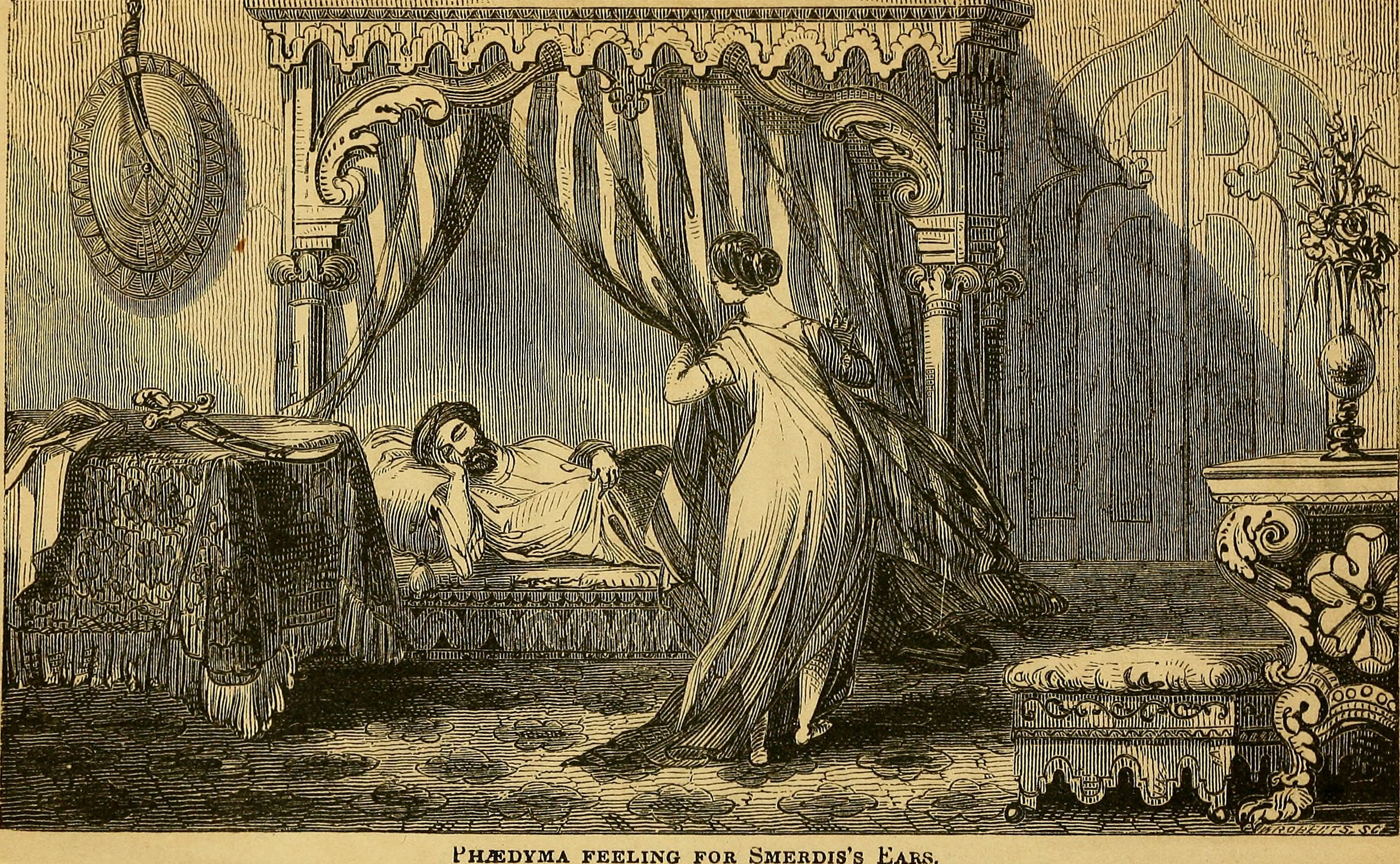
Phaedyme is sent by her father Otanes, to check if King Smerdis has ears under his turban, as the suspected imposter was known to have had them cut off in punishment for a crime. She found that indeed the king did not have ears anymore, which proved that King Bardiya was an imposter, and justify the coup led by Darius I.

He was regarded as a Persian nobleman, being among the few with highest ranks in the kingdom, who was also a political philosopher. Histories 3.68.1, 3.68.3, 3.69.6 has an Otanes as the son of the Achaemenid Pharnaspes, as the father of Phaidyme (or Phaedyma), who in turn is a wife of Cambyses II, and later a wife of the Gaumata alias Smerdis. Herodotus gives this Otanes a role in the overthrow of the false Smerdis, and this Otanes is therefore generally assumed to be identical to a known co-conspirator of Darius I, mentioned in Darius's own list of his helpers at overthrowing Gaumata (DB IV 83). The Behistun inscription has this Otanes as the son of Θuxra, in which case he could not have been the son of Pharnaspes, and so cannot have been a brother of Cassandane (who is said to have been the daughter of Pharnaspes in Histories 2.1.1, 3.2.2), and thus also could not have been brother-in-law of Cyrus II.

Histories 3.68.2 and 3.70 portrays this Otanes as the first person to suspect the king of not being the son of Cyrus, and that Otanes subsequently took the initiative to overthrow him. Supposedly, Otanes has his suspicions confirmed by his daughter Phaidyme, who—as one of the kings wives—establishes that the false Smerdis has no ears, thus identifying him as the same man whom Cyrus had cut the ears off "for some grave reason" (3.69.6). Otanes then gathered five other noblemen and plots to get rid of the false Smerdis. A seventh nobleman, Darius, arrives at the capital Susa shortly thereafter, and was then included in the group. Following the overthrow of the false Smerdis, the seven co-conspirators hold a council to discuss the way forward (3.80–82). Otanes, speaking first, argues for turning the government over to the people, and for the principle of equality before the law (3.80.2, 3.83.1, 6.43.3, isonomíē). Megabyzus spoke next, urging that they resort to an oligarchy "of the best men, ... ourselves among them" (3.81.3). The third to express his opinion was Darius, who argues for a monarchy. In a vote, the majority decides in favour of a monarchy. Otanes then renounces any claim to be king, asking only that he and his descendants be given their independence from royal rule (3.83). The others then hold a contest whereby whichever of them got his horse to neigh first after sunrise shall become king. Darius cheats and ascends the throne (3.84-3.87).

In Histories 3.139-3.149, Otanes ("one of the seven", 3.141.1) reappears as commander of Achaemenid troops during their recapture of Samos for Syloson, the brother of Polycrates.

=== Otanes, son of Sisamnes ===
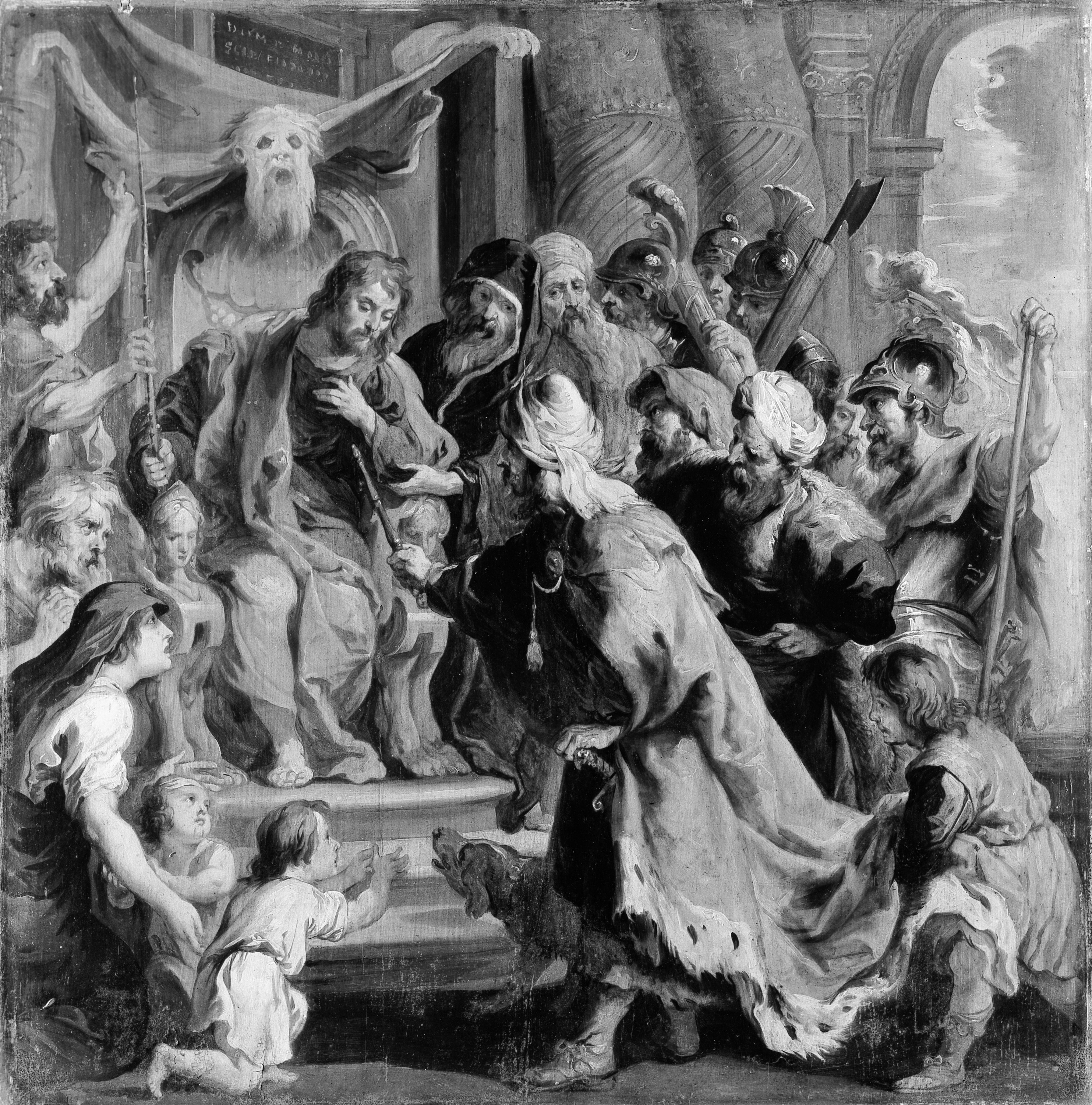
Cambyses II appointing Otanes as judge in place of his flayed father Sisamnes, after a painting by Peter Paul Rubens.

In Histories 5 (Histories 5.25-5.28), Herodotus speaks of an Otanes - a son of a previously mentioned Sisamnes (3.31) - who served as a judge under Cambyses II and later under Darius I, and who following Darius' expedition against the "Scythians", and who succeeded Megabazus as the governor/supreme commander of the united forces of the peoples of the Aegean (5.26.1), and who subjugated Byzantium and other cities during the Ionian revolt (5.123.1, 5.116.1). This Otanes married one of Darius' daughters (5.116.1).

=== Otanes in Histories 7 ===
In Histories 7.40.4, an Otanes is named as the father of Xerxes' charioteer Patiramphes.

In Histories 7.61.2, an Otanes - named as father of Amestris, one of Xerxes' wives - commands the forces of the Persis in Xerxes' campaign against Greece. This Otanes is perhaps the same Otanes as the one of Histories 3 and/or of 7.62.2 and/or of 7.82.1.

In Histories 7.62.2, an Otanes (perhaps the same Otanes as the one of 7.61.2 and/or of 7.82.1) is father of Anaphes, the commander of the Cissians.

In Histories 7.82.1, an Otanes (perhaps the same Otanes as the one of 7.61.2 and/or of 7.62.2) is father of Smerdomenes, one of the six commanders of infantry.

== Legacy ==
As a figurative defender of democracy in Greek literature, the Otanes of Histories 3.68-3.87 has been used as a point of reference in a number of subsequent political discussions. Jean-Jacques Rousseau refers to Otanes in his notes to Discourse on the Origin of Inequality. Otanes is also mentioned in Isaiah Berlin's seminal lecture "Two Concepts of Liberty": "As for Otanes, he wished neither to rule nor to be ruled — the exact opposite of Aristotle's notion of true civic liberty". Otanes has his own conception of freedom.

Otanes also appears in certain works of fiction and drama. James Baldwin fictionalizes the childhood of Otanes in his short story, "The Boy and The Robbers" from his book, Fifty Famous People, a book of short stories". In addition, the Dutch TV movie Volk en vaderliefde ('People and Fatherly Love', 1976) is about Otanes and the coup.

== Sources ==
- Herodotus (1862). History of Herodotus, Volume 2. pp. 384–396.
