= Patizeithes =

Late 6th century BC Persian magus (priest)

Patizeithes (Greek: Πατιζείθης, romanized: Patizeíthēs) was a Persian magus (priest) who flourished in the second half of the 6th century BC. According to Herodotus, he persuaded his brother Smerdis (Gaumata) in 521 BC to rebel against Cambyses II (r. 530–522 BC), who at the time ruled as King of Kings of the Achaemenid Persian Empire. Herodotus states that Patizeithes was eventually killed by Cambyses's successor Darius (later "the Great") (r. 522–486 BC).

The name "Patizeithes" is the form recorded by Herodotus. Dionysius of Miletus cited his name as Panzouthes, which is identical to Pazates as recorded by Xanthus the Lydian. The later Roman historian Justin recorded his name as Oropastes. According to the modern Iranologist Josef Wiesehöfer, the name "Patizeithes" should be interpreted as a title, "although it is etymologically unclear". Wiesehöfer notes that the name may be connected to the word Pitiáchēs as recorded in later Greek sources, which is known in Middle Persian as btḥšy (bidaxsh), i.e. "viceroy".

According to Shahbazi, Oropastes was a Median nobleman from the Magi tribe, and not a magus (priest). His name, Oropastes, comes from "Ahura-upaštu" which means, “He who has Ahura Mazdās protection”. Cambyses II had appointed him Steward of his House (viceroy of the empire) before leaving to campaign in Egypt. While he was away, Oropastes placed his own brother, Gaumata on the throne and pretended that he was Bardiya, the murdered brother of Cambyses II. When news reached Cambyses II, he hurried back home, but died on the way. On his deathbed, Cambyses II appointed Darius, who was at the time the king’s “Spear bearer” and other nobles with the task of removing the usurper and restoring the throne. Darius executed Gaumata and became King himself.

== Sources ==
- Wiesehöfer, Josef (2006). "Patizeithes". In Salazar, Christine F.; Landfester, Manfred; Gentry, Francis G. (eds.). Brill's New Pauly. Brill Online.
