= Achaemenid navy =

Navy of the Persian Empire

Achaemenid Navy
- Active: 525 BC–330 BC
- Country: Persia
- Type: Ancient navy
- Size: 36,000–42,000 men at least (modern estimates)
- Central Base: Cilicia; Kyme/Phokaia
- Fleet: 1,207 warships and 3,000 transport ships at peak (ancient sources); 500–1,000 vessels (modern estimates)
- Engagements: Greco-Persian Wars; • Battle of Salamis; • Battle of Artemisium; • Battle of the Eurymedon; Corinthian War; • Battle of Cnidus; Peloponnesian War; • Battle of Cyzicus; Ionian Revolt; • Battle of Lade; Battle of Pelusium

Insignia
- Ensign

The Achaemenid navy (Old Persian: 𐎴𐎠𐎺 nāva) was the principal naval force of the Achaemenid Empire which existed between 525 BC and 330 BC.

== Etymology ==
In Old Persian, the written language of Achaemenid inscriptions, the word used to refer to the 'navy' or 'fleet' was "nāva", a noun in plural feminine nominative form. It is of the same root of Indo-European for words such as "navy" and "navigate". In modern usage of Persian language, the word has retained its form and meaning (lit. 'warships').

== Historiography ==
No relevant primary documents have been found about it, nor have any ruins of Persian naval installations or remains of ships been excavated. While independent Persian tradition is lost, all we know about the Achaemenid navy is recorded by ancient Greek historians like Herodotus.

== History ==
Scholars categorize the record of operation of the navy to two distinct periods from 525 to 479, and from 479 to 330 BC.

=== The First Period (525–479 BC) ===
Cambyses founded the navy for conquest of Egypt in the Battle of Pelusium. After him, Darius I deployed the navy to strengthen dominance over the coast of Asia Minor, as well as its adjacent islands. During reign of Darius, Persians captured Samos (c. 517 BC), conquered Thrace, waged war on Scythia (c. 512 BC), and suppressed rebellions started in 500 BC, leading to the Battle of Lade (494 BC).

=== The Second Period (479–330 BC) ===
The navy had lost its presence in the Aegean Sea, and its strength was reduced. In the Battle of the Eurymedon (c. 468 BC), the Persians were defeated and lost 200 ships according to the account of Thucydides. The next significant defeat occurred in c. 450 BC, when they lost a war in Cyprus (near modern-day Larnaca).

== Organization ==
The creation the organization, infrastructure, and financial basis of the Achaemenid navy is attributed to Darius I.

=== Bases ===
Approximate location of Achaemenid naval bases

==== Headquarters ====
The coasts of Phoenicia, as well as Cyprus and Cilicia, always played a strategic role in the Achaemenid navy. Strabo and Herodotus mentioned two central bases for the navy: one in Cilicia and the other in Kyme–Phocaea (both located in modern-day Turkey). Centers that trained crew for vessels were isolated from the central bases. The Cilician base was heavily guarded by a large number of troops, whose payments were financed by the local tributes in that satrapy. It is likely that Acco served as the third main base.

According to Kaveh Farrokh, the first naval headquarters that hosted high command of the navy was located along the Shatt al-Arab, where it leads to the Persian Gulf (located in the modern-day Khuzestan Province of Iran). However, Cilicia was the main base and was always ready for deployment because unlike Shatt al-Arab, it was intended for power projection.

==== Other naval bases ====
Smaller squadrons were stationed elsewhere, like those of Sidon and Halicarnassus, as well as Samos. An important base was a shipyard located at Tripolis, where Lebanese timber were nearby. The Nile valley also served as a strategic base of operation, when Egypt was a satrapy. The same situation applied to Cyprus. Achaemenid settlements like Bahrain, Oman, Yemen and the Indian subcontinent were regular destinations for naval ships.

It is thought likely that bases existed in Abdera and Myus, though this is uncertain.

=== Area of operations ===
The naval forces had an active presence in the Black Sea, the Aegean Sea, the Mediterranean Sea and the Persian Gulf among others. They operated patrols in river or littoral environments like Shatt al-Arab and Euphrates in Mesopotamia, Nile in Egypt and Sind in the Indian subcontinent.

=== Command hierarchy and personnel ===
The command hierarchy of the navy is not certain, but Greek sources indicate that high commanders were selected from the imperial aristocracy. There are reports of commanders of ships, and commanding officers of fleets with various non-Persians backgrounds, such as those of Carians. Commanders of Greek origin are also reported to have served in the navy, including even one Athenian. Almost nothing is known about sailors of lower rank. In the wake of creating the navy, Persians hired Phoenician rowers and sailors, but later recruited from other subject peoples. The marines standing in the forces were either Persians, Medes, or Scythians.

The servicemen were probably employed with full payment, because lengthy deployments imposed a drastic change to their communities especially if it included one or two harvests.

== Fleet ==
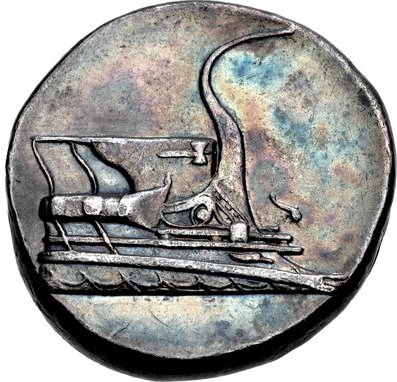
Prow of galley with hornlike akrostolion (c. 350–333 BC)

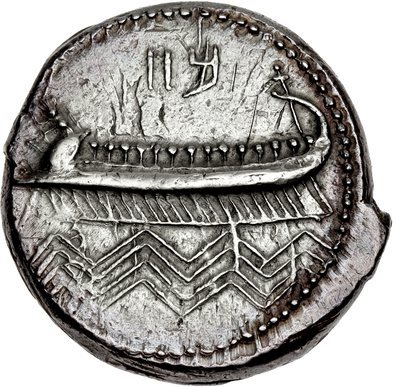
Mazaeus coin depicting a pentekonter (c. 353–333 BC)

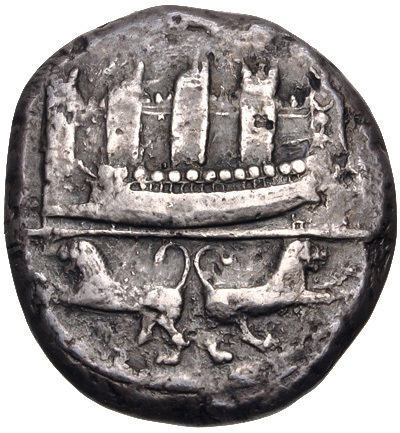
Galley on a Sidonian coin (c. 425–401 BC)

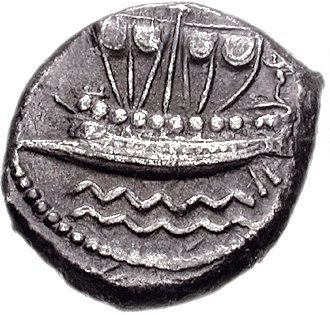
Vessel on a Sidonian coin (c. 435–425 BC)

=== Vessels ===
The first Achaemenid naval vessels, which were built at Phoenician shipyards, measured 40 meters (130 ft) in length and 6 meters (20 ft) width, and were capable of carrying 300 troops at best. According to Christopher Tuplin, Cypriot ships "appear a significant element in Persian fleets on various occasions".

==== Persian triremes ====
The Persians were the first nation to use triremes in significant numbers. The first large trireme was commissioned by Cambyses. By 490 BC, the backbone of the fleet was consisted of triremes. Some triremes were modified as troopers, as well as some for carrying horses and supplies or building bridges.

Design and dimensions

Persian triremes differed from those of the Greek, and used Phoenician design. The third level of rowers in Greek vessels was accommodated by adding a outrigger, but the Persians added to the height of the compartment instead.

They reportedly were 110 feet (34 m) to 120 feet (37 m) long and had a beam of 15 feet (4.6 m). The ships were most likely capable of reaching 12 knots (22 km/h) under good sailing conditions. They could reach full speed in 30 seconds from a dead stop.

Equipped with one mast with square sail, the triremes had rudders made up of two bladed oars, one on each side of stern, united by a crossbar. The ram was made out of bronze, and was long and tapered to a single point.

Armaments

The metal rams were designed to slice into the hulls of enemy ships after an impact. Equipment included grappling hooks (used to catch and halt enemy ships) and two mangonels, the latter throwing stones or flammable projectiles.

Crew

A typical Persian trireme is reported to have had 170 rowers, with the upper file carrying 62, and the middle and lower files each 54. In addition to the rowers, other personnel aboard triremes included 14 marines and some spare rowers and oars in case they were needed. In 480 BC, each trireme carried 200 men and 30 marines, according to Herodotus. Triremes were too crowded to store their own supplies, and relied on support vessels for food and water. It was normal for the crew to disembark in the evening for eating and sleep.

==== Other warships ====
Achaemenid navy later used more advanced vessels like quinqueremes. Other types of vessel in the fleet were triaconters, penteconters and light boats. Smaller vessels used for river patrols could carry a maximum of 100–200 troops.

==== Transport vessels ====
The navy operated a large number of vessels used to carry food and other supplies, which commonly had a displacement of 100 to 150 tons, at the time they invaded Egypt in 373 BC. Ships capable of carrying 350 to 500 tons were also used in significant numbers. They also had horse transporters (hippagogoi) specifically built for this purpose, that could easily carry 30 horses. Persian horse transport ships were good sailing ships that took advantage of the favorable winds, according to Anthony J. Papalas, who adds they were probably designed to match the speed of a trireme. It is probable that horse transports were galleys with a shallow draft, that allowed horses get off in the waters and embark via a ramp.

==== Bridge vessels ====
The Achaemenids are known to have used vessels for connecting the banks of rivers. The bridges were built by joining vessels to one another and lashing them together, to erect a roadway with planks. Xenophon reports such bridges, one made using 37 boats on Tigris, and another using seven on Maeander.

=== Size ===
During its early years under Cambyses, the Achaemenid navy is assumed to possess about 300 triremes, which was equal to the sum of the fleet of Egypt and its ally Polycrates of Samos. This number was later doubled, with 600 triremes mentioned in 494 and 490 BC. The initial set-up of the navy (300 triremes) may have had up to 51,000 rowers and thousands of sailors and marines.

The original number of vessels in the fleet was eventually quadrupled, according to Greek sources. Herodotus' account of naval forces under Xerxes I, put the number of warships in service at 1,207, in addition to 3,000 transport ships. Contemporary academic estimates range from 500 to 1,000 vessels, according to Matt Waters. Scholars maintain that this number included large numbers of reserve ships, and the navy had not enough full oar crews to operate them all. Herodotus also states that Persians arrived for the Battle of Marathon (490 BC) with 600 triremes and some horse transport vessels. Though the number is rejected by some academics, Anthony J. Papalas states that evidence does support this report. Considering that each ship had an average of 50 oarsmen (the absolute minimum for a trireme) and 10 to 20 seamen and marines were also aboard, the navy compromised 36,000 to 42,000 men, at least.

After the Battle of Salamis (480 BC), the fleet began to decline and never regained its peak numbers. The largest figure estimated after 404 BC is 400 triremes. The number was still equal to, if not more than, the fleets of the Athenian alliance.

== Flag ==
Xenophon wrote in Anabasis, "his (Cyrus the Younger) ensign was a golden eagle with outspread wings mounted upon a long shaft and this continues even unto this day as the ensign of the Persian king". While there is not much to confirm this, some scholars maintain that Alexander Mosaic contained a depiction of the standard (on the part which is now damaged), head of a bird in yellow on a red cloth. There is also a square plaque found at Apadana in plain, and it is quite possible that it shows the eagle.

== Impact and legacy ==
The Achaemenid navy was the first true "imperial navy" that appeared in history. Persians are also credited for establishing the 'trireme navy' as the naval standard of their time. The establishment of the Achaemenid navy set the basis of Iranian naval engineering, as well as "a powerful Persian maritime tradition that remained in the region until the arrival of the British East India Company and the Royal Navy by the mid-19th century AD".

The naval forces affected the coastal subjects of the Achaemenid Empire to a great extent. They were put under much tighter control from the capital, and were heavily involved in military campaigns of the Achaemenids. The Sidonians profited financially from the naval base stationed in their city.

== See also ==
- Naval history of Iran
  - Sassanian navy
  - Afsharid navy
- Ancient navies and vessels
  - Ancient Egyptian navy
  - Roman navy
