= Phaedymia =

6th-century BCE Persian noblewoman

Phaedymia (or Phaedyme, Phædima; Greek: Φαιδύμη) was the daughter of Otanes, a nobleman of the Achaemenid Persian court in the early 6th century BCE. She was married, successively, to Cambyses II, then Bardiya (or Galatia), and then Darius I.

Herodotus tells us in his Histories that the Persian king Cambyses II married Phaedymia. Otanes may have been the brother of Cassandane, who was Cambyses' mother. If this is correct, Phaedymia was not only Cambyses's wife but also his cousin.

Cambyses died in the spring of 522 BCE and was succeeded by Bardiya, son of Cyrus. But according to the conventional history as related by ancient writers, the "Bardiya" now on the throne was an impostor; in reality he was a magus named Gaumata. Herodotus wrote that Otanes was the first to suspect that the new king was an impostor. Next came Phaedymia who, with all the other wives of Cambyses, was now wife of the false Bardiya. Phaedymia told her father of the ruse. Upon hearing this, Otanes organized a conspiracy that ousted Gaumata put Darius I on the Persian throne in the autumn of 522 BCE. Phaedymia then married Darius; her father Otanes married a sister of Darius.

Most modern historians do not consider Darius's version of events (i.e., the conventional history) convincing, and assume that the person who ruled for a few months was the real son of Cyrus, and that the story of his impersonation by a magus was an invention of Darius to justify his seizure of the throne.
