= Jean-Adrien Guignet =

French orientalist painter (1816–1854)

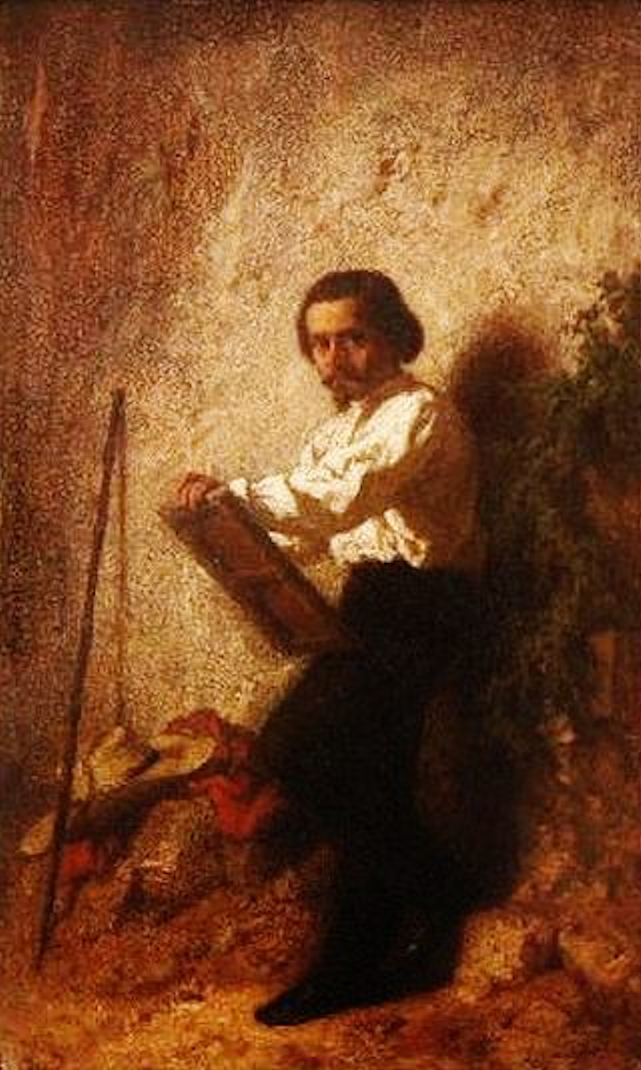
Jean-Adrien Guignet. Self-portrait. Musée Rolin

Jean-Adrien Guignet (1816 – 1854) was a French orientalist painter.

Guignet was born in Annecy and grew up in the city of Autun. He was a friend of Hippolyte Michaud. He was a rather popular orientalist painter in his time, and was especially commanded for his Egyptian scenes. He died in Paris.

== Works ==
Musée des beaux-arts de Beaune

- Soldat gaulois (circa 1854)
- Agar et Ismaël

Musée du Louvre

- Cambise et Psamménite
- Épisode de la retraite des Dix-Mille (circa 1842)

Musée des beaux-arts de Rouen

- Joseph expliquant les rêves du pharaon

Musée Rolin

- Xerxes à l'Hellespont
- Autoportrait ("Self-portrait")

== Gallery ==
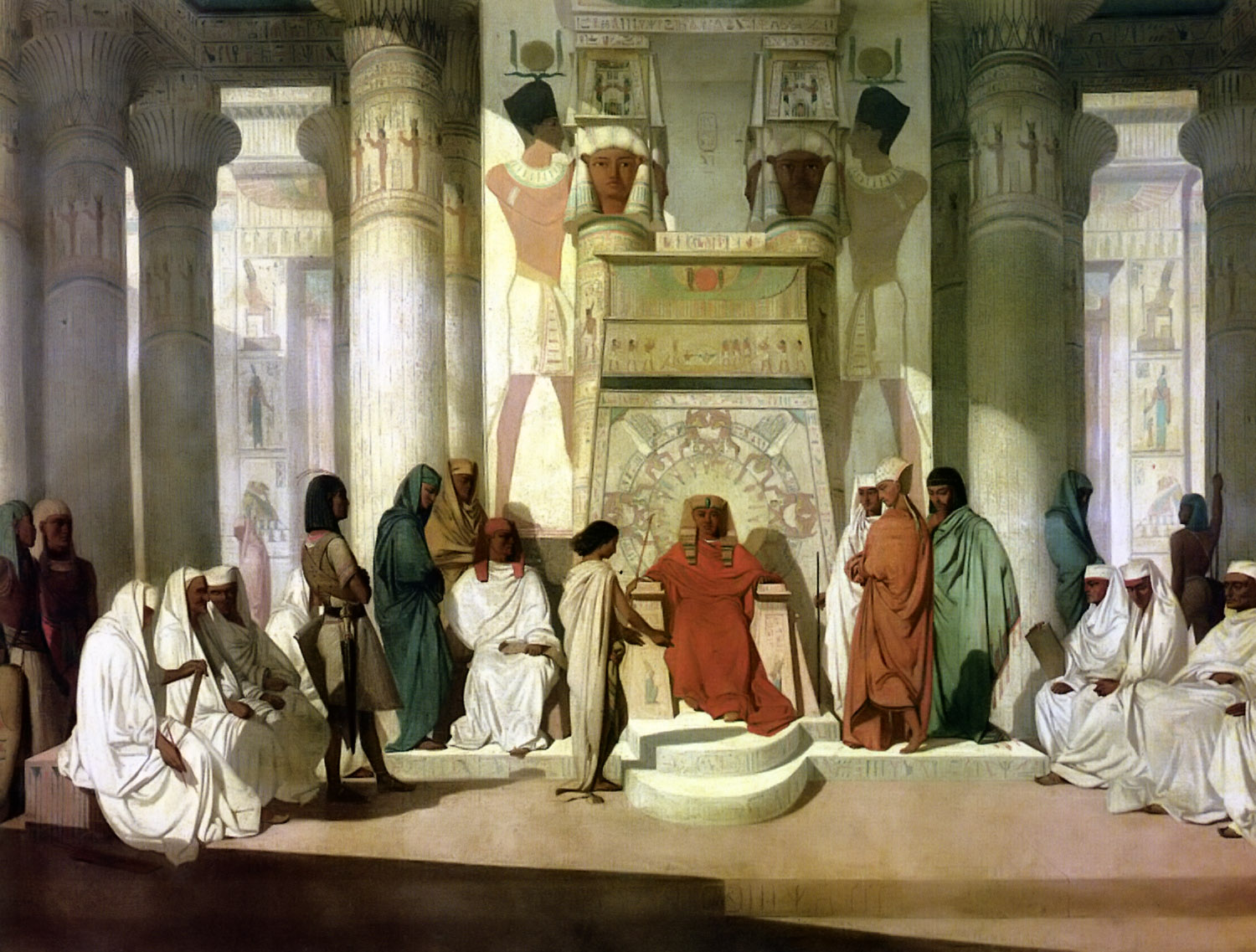
Joseph expliquant les rêves du pharaon, Musée des beaux-arts de Rouen

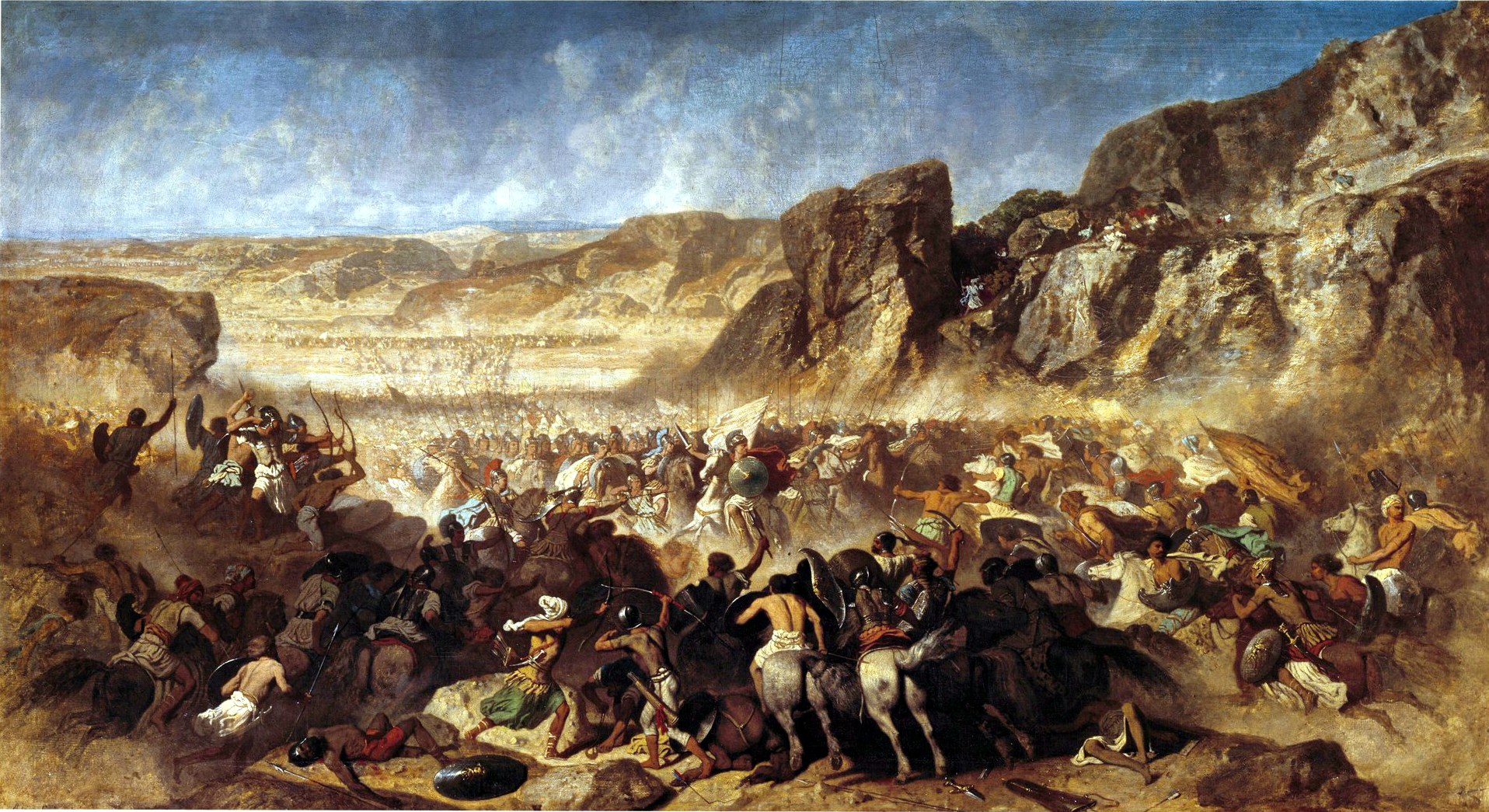
Retreat of the Ten Thousand, at the Battle of Cunaxa

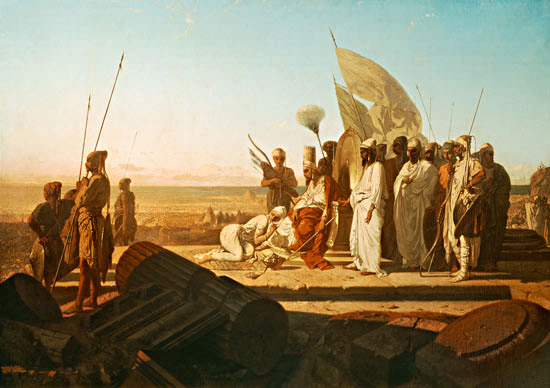
Xerxes at the Hellespont

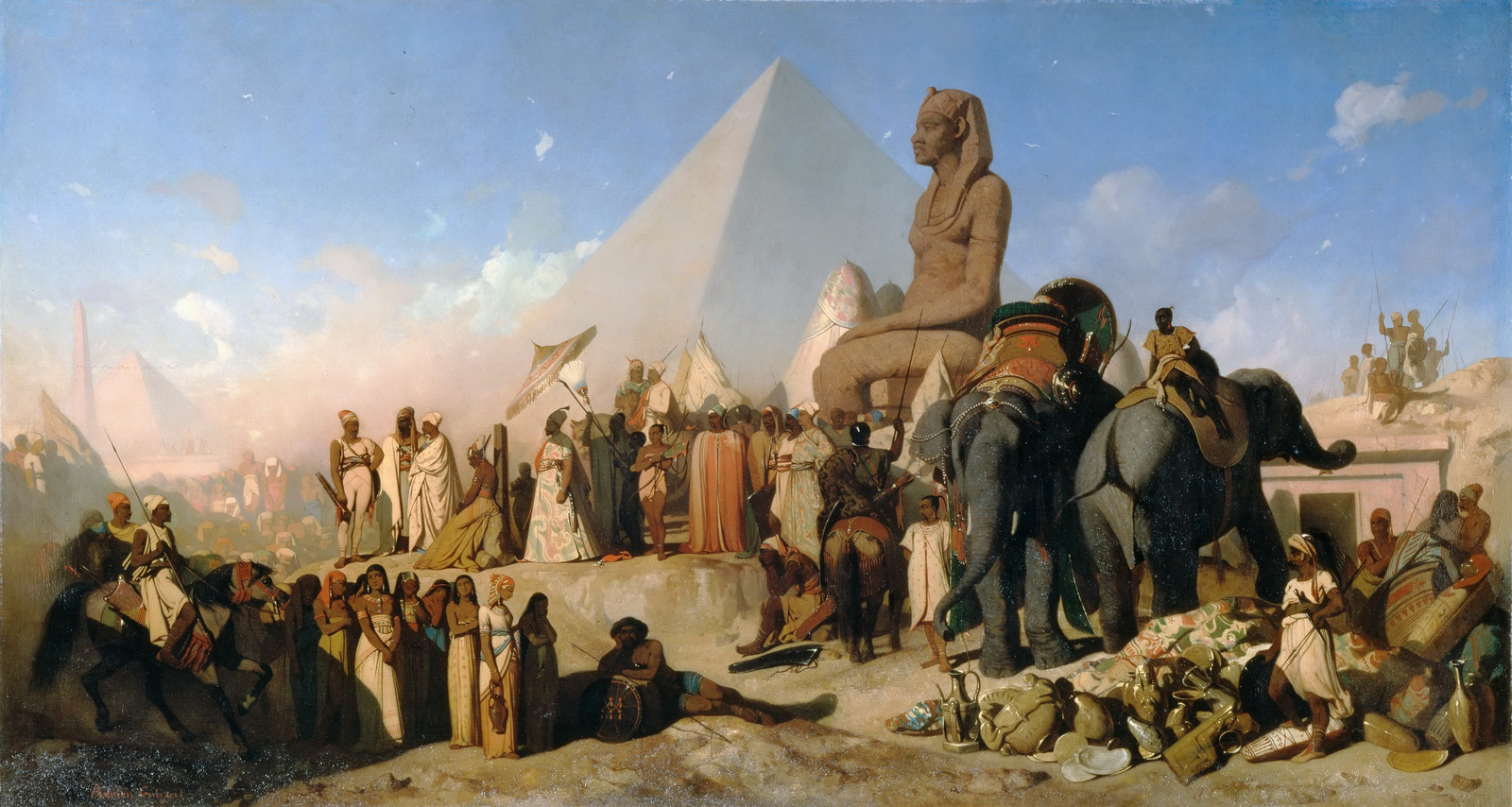
Meeting Between Cambyses II and Psammetichus III after the Battle of Pelusium. Louvre Museum.
