= Paishiyauvada =

Achaemenid Persian city

Paishiyauvada was a Persian city during the Achaemenid era.

Gaumata the Magian pretended to be Smerdis and proclaimed himself king on the mountain Arakadrish near the town Paishiyauvada. This town was probably on the Zagros mountain range on the border of Persis and Elam.

Paishiyauvada was `Home of the Archives and Sacred Writings`, probably of Pasargadae.

The name Paishiyauvada is from Old Persian paishiya- (writing) + -uvada (abode).

Darius the Great at Behistun inscription says: "Darius the King says: Afterwards, there was one man, a Magian, named Gaumata; he rose up from Paishiyauvada. A mountain named Arakadri -- from there 14 days of the month Viyakhna were past when he rose up. He lied to the people thus: "I am Smerdis, the son of Cyrus, brother of Cambyses."

== Sources ==
Kent, R.G., Old Persian: Grammar, texts, lexicon, 2nd edn, New Haven 1953. p. 194.
