= Cambyses II =

Ruler of the Achaemenid Empire from 530 to 522 BC

Cambyses II; 𐎣𐎲𐎢𐎪𐎡𐎹
- King of the Lands
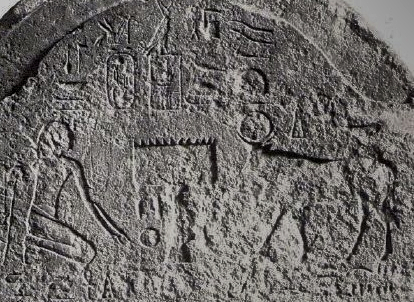
- Cambyses (left, kneeling) as pharaoh while worshipping an Apis bull (524 BC)

King of Kings of the Achaemenid Empire
- Reign: 530 – July 522 BC
- Predecessor: Cyrus the Great
- Successor: Bardiya
- Co-ruler: Cyrus the Great (530 BC)

Pharaoh of Egypt
- Reign: 525 – July 522 BC
- Predecessor: Psamtik III
- Successor: Bardiya
- Died: July 522 BC; Agbatana, Eber-Nari
- Consort: See below
- Dynasty: Achaemenid (Teispid)
- Father: Cyrus the Great
- Mother: Cassandane
Religion
Ancient Iranian religion
Cambyses II
- Military career
- Conflicts: Conflicts: Wars of Cambyses; First Egyptian Persian War; Siege of Gaza; Battle of Pelusium; Siege of Memphis

Cambyses II (Note: Old Persian: 𐎣𐎲𐎢𐎪𐎡𐎹, romanized: Kaᵐbūjiya) was the second King of Kings of the Achaemenid Empire, reigning from 530 to 522 BCE. He was the son of and successor to Cyrus the Great (r. 550–530 BC); his mother was Cassandane. His relatively brief reign was marked by his conquests in North Africa, notably Egypt, which he took by defeating pharaoh Psamtik III (r. 526–525 BC) at the Battle of Pelusium in 525 BC. After his victory in Egypt, he expanded the empire's holdings in Africa by taking Cyrenaica, the coastal region of eastern Libya. In the spring of 522 BC, Cambyses had to leave Egypt hastily to put down a revolt in Persia.

En route to Syria (Eber-Nari), Cambyses somehow received a thigh wound; it soon became gangrenous. Cambyses died three weeks later in Agbatana, likely the modern city of Hama. He died childless, and was thus succeeded by his younger brother Bardiya. Bardiya ruled for a short time, and was then overthrown by Darius the Great (r. 522–486 BC), who went on to increase the power of the Achaemenids further.

Before his accession, Cambyses was governor of northern Babylonia under his father Cyrus from April to December 538 BCE. He held positions in Babylon and Sippar. In 530 BCE, his father made him co-ruler. Cyrus then set off on an expedition against the Massagetae of Central Asia, where he met his end. Cambyses thus became the sole ruler of the vast Achaemenid Empire. According to chroniclers, he faced no opposition.

== Etymology ==
The origins of the name of "Cambyses" (Old Persian: 𐎣𐎲𐎢𐎪𐎡𐎹, romanized: Kaᵐbūjiya) is disputed in scholarship; according to some scholars, the name is of Elamite origin, whilst others associate it with Kambojas, an Iranian people who inhabited northwestern India. The name of Cambyses is known in other languages as: Elamite Kanbuziya; Akkadian Kambuziya; Aramaic Kanbūzī.

== Dynastic history ==
Cambyses was the eldest son of Cyrus the Great (r. 550–530 BC) and Cassandane. (Note: According to 5th-century BC Greek historian Ctesias, the mother of Cambyses II was Amytis, a daughter of the last Median king Astyages (r. 585–550 BC). However, according to the Russian Iranologist Muhammad Dandamayev, this statement is not trustworthy.) Cambyses had a younger brother, Bardiya, and three sisters; these were Artystone, Atossa, and Roxanne. Cambyses's paternal grandfather was his namesake Cambyses I, the king of Persis from 600 to 559 BC. The family was descended from a line of rulers of Persian tribes who, starting with Cyrus in Anshan, expanded their reach over Persis by subjugating first the Median Empire, then the Neo-Babylonian Empire, and finally Lydia and Central Asia to establish the Achaemenid Empire.

== Early life ==
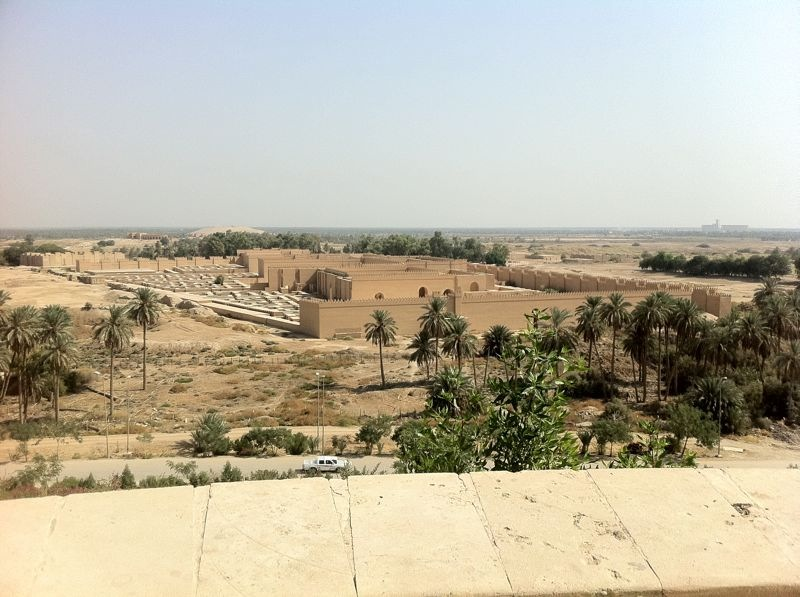
Overview of the ruins of Babylon

In April 538 BC, Cambyses was appointed by his father as the governor of the northern part of Babylonia, including its city Babylon, whilst the central and southern part continued to be directly supervised by Cyrus and his bureaucrats. Before his appointment, Cambyses had taken part in a ritual at the regular New Year festival on 27 March 538 BC, where he received the royal sceptre in Esagila, a temple dedicated to the god Marduk. His governorship, however, lasted only nine months; Cyrus dismissed him from the post in December 538 BC for unknown reasons. After his dismissal, Cambyses continued to mostly reside in the Babylonian cities of Babylon and Sippar.

According to Babylonian records, both Cambyses and Cyrus carried the title of "King of Babylon, King of the Lands" in 538/7 BC, which indicates that Cyrus had appointed him as co-ruler some years before his campaign against the Massagetae. Cyrus's younger son, Bardiya, was given his own realm in Central Asia, which was exempted from paying tribute. Cambyses reportedly took part in the expedition against the Massagetae, but, due to his being the heir to the throne, he was sent back to Persia, before Cyrus fell to the Massagetae. Cambyses had his father's body carried to Pasargadae in Persis, where he was buried in a tomb that had been prepared for him earlier.

== Military campaigns ==
=== Preparations against Egypt and the conquest of Cyprus ===
Evolution of the Achaemenid Empire.

Cambyses's accession to the Achaemenid throne was relatively smooth. Ruling over a vast but young empire, Cambyses preserved his authority over the subjugated lands, but also expanded his dominion over Egypt, the last prominent power in the Near East. According to the French Iranologist Pierre Briant, "this must not be seen as a more or less irrational and uncontrollable desire to take over the entire inhabited world". On the contrary, Cambyses's action had already been planned by his father, who wanted to unify Babylonia with the lands of the Trans-Euphrates (an area that stretched from Posideium to Egypt). This would eventually require conquering the lands situated between the Euphrates and Nile rivers, and therefore necessitated conflict with Egypt, which had previously and more recently shown interest in the area.

The pharaoh of Egypt was Amasis II, who had been ruling since 570. His ally, Polycrates, a Greek ruler of Samos, posed a considerable threat to the Achaemenids, launching several raids that jeopardised Achaemenid authority. However, Polycrates eventually broke with his Egyptian allies and reached out to Cambyses, with whose plans he was well-acquainted. The sudden change was doubtless due to his uneasy position, with the Spartans raising a force against him and the rising hostility of the Samian aristocrats, who preferred partnership with Egypt. Another former ally of Amasis II, the Carian military leader Phanes of Halicarnassus, had also joined Cambyses after escaping assassins sent by the pharaoh. Cambyses, before starting his expedition into Egypt, had seized Cyprus from Amasis II, dealing a heavy blow to the pharaoh.

=== Conquest of Egypt and its surroundings ===
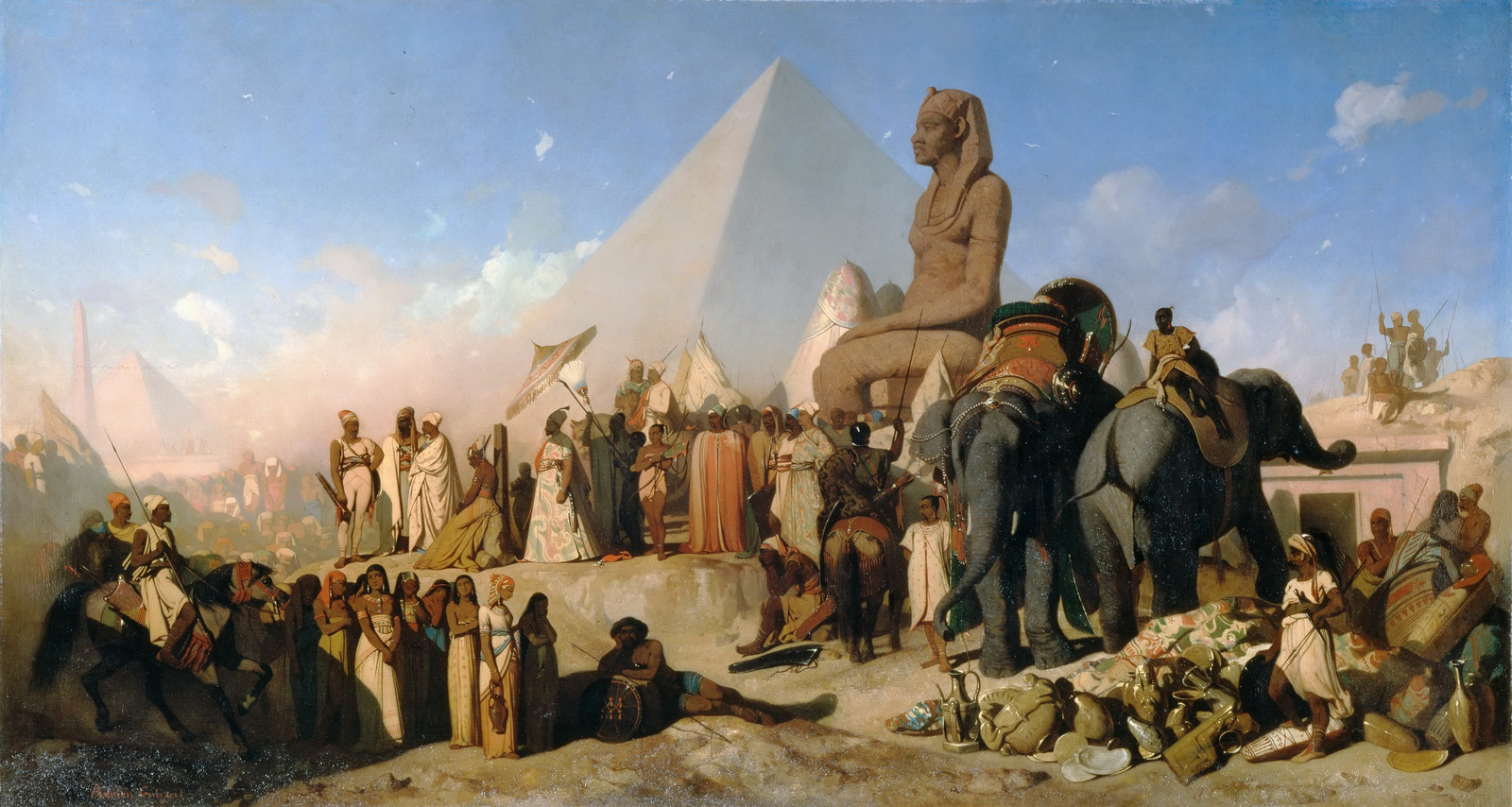
Imaginary 19th-century illustration of Cambyses II meeting Psamtik III.

By 526 BC, Amasis II had died. He was succeeded by his son Psamtik III. meanwhile, Cambyses had made substantial improvements to his forces. He had laid the foundations for the Achaemenid navy, essential to his ambitions to conquer Egypt. The navy was created using men and equipment from Phoenicia and Asia Minor. During his march to Egypt, Cambyses made a treaty with the Arabs who controlled the desert area between Gaza and the Egyptian frontier. This treaty granted Cambyses sufficient water for his forces to reach the Nile. Cambyses would extend his authority over the lands between Egypt and Persia. These would include Gaza, a prominent commercial region, rivaling Sardis in Lydia. The region served as the headquarters for the Persian expedition into Egypt.

In 525 BC, Cambyses invaded Egypt. In the spring of that year, the Persian and Egyptian forces clashed at Pelusium, where the Persians emerged victorious. According to one author, Cambyses was able to defeat the Egyptians by putting cats, sheep, dogs and other animals that the Egyptians considered sacred in the front lines. This led the Egyptians to cease using their engines of war for fear of killing an animal and angering the gods. The forces of Cambyses then laid siege to Memphis, which Psamtik III and his men had invested. Despite considerable resistance by pharaoh's forces, Cambyses captured Memphis and established a Persian-Egyptian garrison there. By summer, all of Egypt was under Persian suzerainty. Cambyses now adopted the aspirations of the last pharaohs in seeking to control the neighbouring lands towards the west (Libya and Cyrenaica) and south (Nubia).

=== Further conquests ===
The Libyans, and soon the Greeks of Cyrene and Barca, willingly acknowledged the authority of Cambyses. As a demonstration of his generosity, Cambyses had Amasis II's Greek widow, Ladice, returned to Cyrene. Cambyses wanted to attack the Phoenician state of Carthage to the west of Egypt; he never did so, due to his Phoenician subjects' reluctance to make war against their own. In the south, Cambyses followed the policy of the last pharaohs to keep the Kingdom of Kush in check. He established a garrison in Elephantine.

According to Herodotus, Cambyses's campaigns against Ammon in the Siwa Oasis and Kush ended in catastrophe. He states that the reason behind this defeat was the "madness" of Cambyses, who "at once began his march against Kush, without any orders for the provision of supplies, and without for a moment considering the fact that he was to take his men to the ends of the earth". This is called the Lost Army of Cambyses.

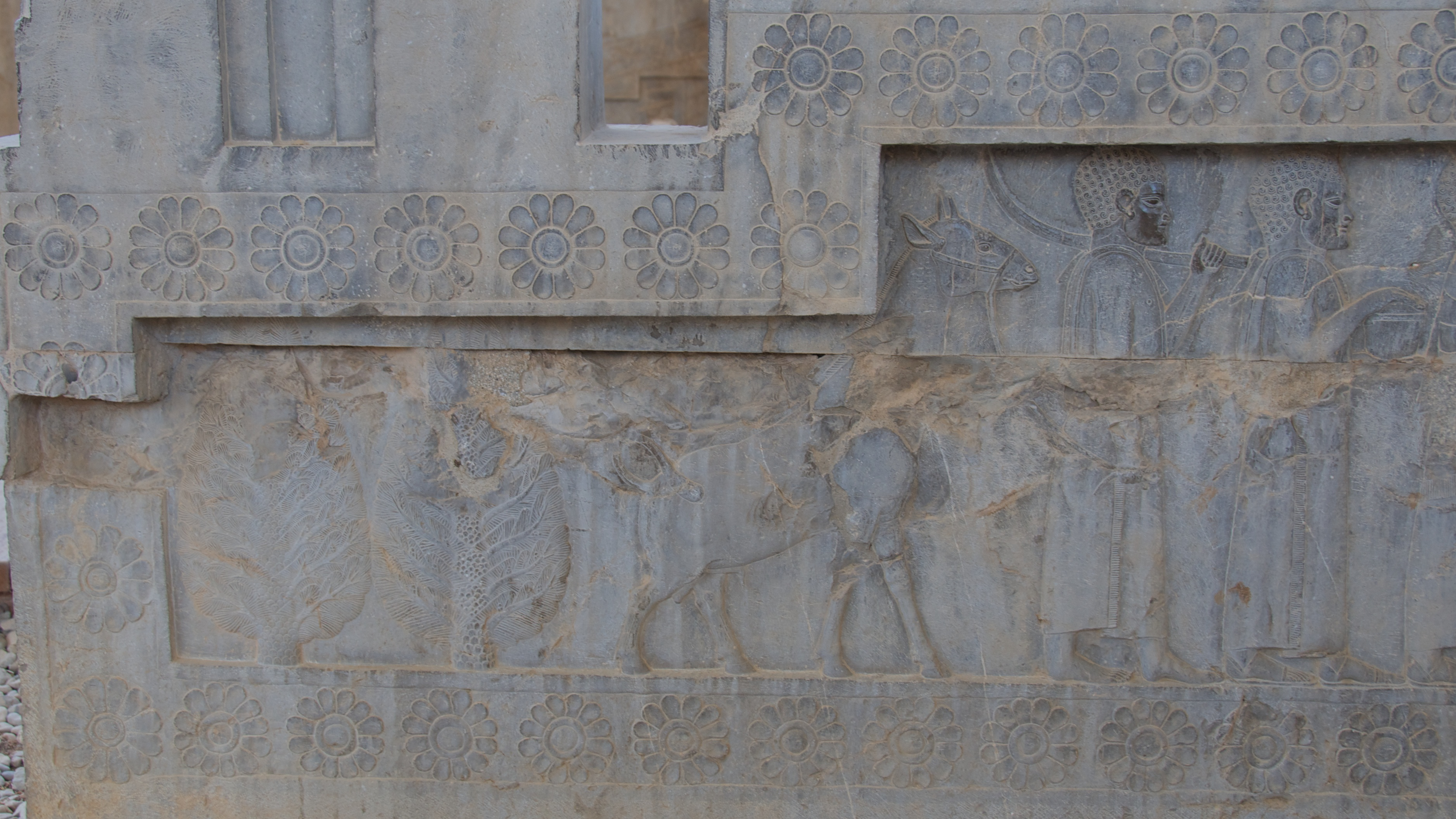
Ethiopians bring tribute in the Apadana reliefs in Persepolis

However, according to Briant, "the deliberate bias against Cambyses raises doubts about the accuracy of Herodotus's version." Herodotus's statement is contradicted by other sources that do not suggest a catastrophe for his forces. Cambyses may have faced difficulties in the campaign that may have forced him to abort it. However, archaeological evidence shows that the Achaemenids occupied their stronghold of Dorginarti (south of Buhen) when in control of Egypt. Furthermore, in two inscriptions of Darius, Nubia is listed as one of the lands in the empire, and a Nubian delegation is depicted in Persepolis on the Apadana reliefs, which visually present the lands of Darius's empire. These suggest that Cambyses saw success in subduing Nubia.

== Administration ==
=== Policies in Egypt ===
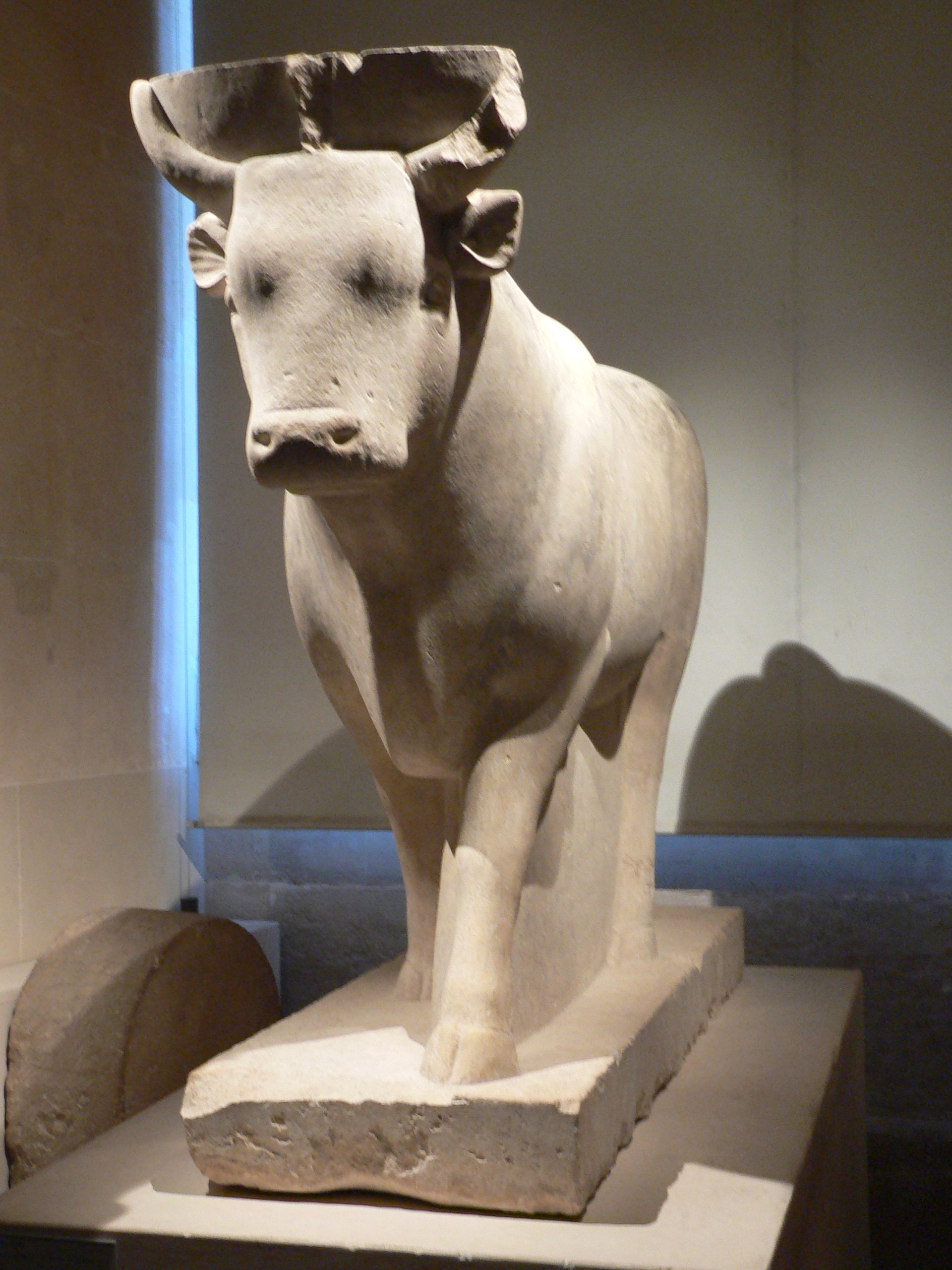
Statue of an Apis

In accordance with the traditional Egyptian royal custom, Cambyses took the titles of "king of Upper and Lower Egypt" and "descendant of (the gods) Ra, Horus, Osiris," used by the previous Egyptian pharaohs. Cambyses used propaganda to show his Egyptian conquest as a legitimate unification with the native Egyptians, and that he was himself of Egyptian descent, claiming to be the son of Princess Nitetis, a daughter of the pharaoh Apries, much as his father had claimed Median descent when he took over Media. At Sais, Cambyses had himself crowned in the temple of the goddess Neith as part of a religious ritual, during which he made sacrifices to the Egyptian gods.

According to ancient historians, Cambyses's rule of Egypt was marked by brutality, looting temples, ridiculing the local gods, and defilement of the royal tombs. Historians such as Herodotus put an emphasis on Cambyses's supposed killing of the Egyptian sacred bull Apis. However, no looting of temples has been reported by contemporary Egyptian sources. In addition, Cambyses is said to have ordered the burial of an Apis in a sarcophagus. The successor of the Apis died in 518 BC, four years after Cambyses had already died.

The epitaph of the Apis buried in 524 BC, states:

[Year] 6, third month of the season Shemou, day 10 (?), under the Majesty of the king of Upper and Lower Egypt [...] endowed with eternal life, the god was brought in [peace toward the good West and laid to rest in the necropolis in] his [place] which is the place which his Majesty had made for him, [after] all [the ceremonies had been done for him] in the embalming hall [...] It was done according to everything his Majesty had said [...]

A legend on the sarcophagus also says:

(Cambyses], the king of Upper and Lower Egypt [...] made as his monument to his father Apis-Osiris a large sarcophagus of granite, dedicated by the king [...], endowed with all life, with all perpetuity and prosperity (?), with all health, with all joy, appearing eternally as king of Upper and Lower Egypt.

This thus debunks Cambyses's supposed killing of the Apis, and according to Briant, proves that Herodotus documented bogus reports. Rather, Cambyses took part in the preservation and burial ceremony of an Apis. Other similar sources also make mention of Cambyses's careful treatment towards Egyptian culture and religion. According to the Egyptian Demotic Chronicle, Cambyses decreased the immense income that the Egyptian temples received from the Egyptian pharaohs. Only the three main temples were given permission to maintain all their entitlements. In response to this action, Egyptian priests who had lost their entitlements circulated spurious stories about Cambyses. The issue with the temples dated back to the earlier pharaohs, who had also tried to reduce the economic power of the temples. This issue would continue until the demise of ancient Egypt. Like Cyrus in Babylon, Cambyses allowed the Egyptian nobility to maintain their jurisdictions.

=== Imperial Administration ===
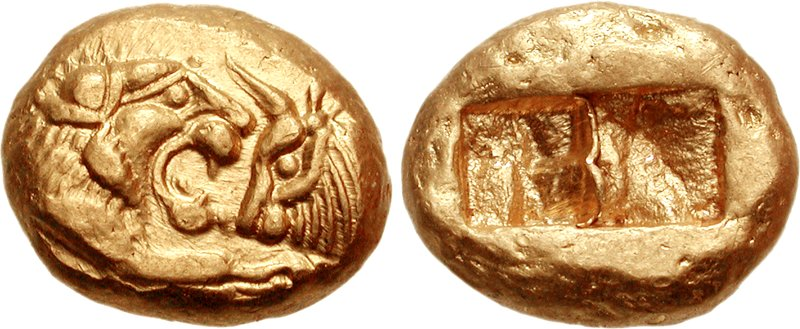
Achaemenid coin minted at Sardis, possibly under Cambyses II

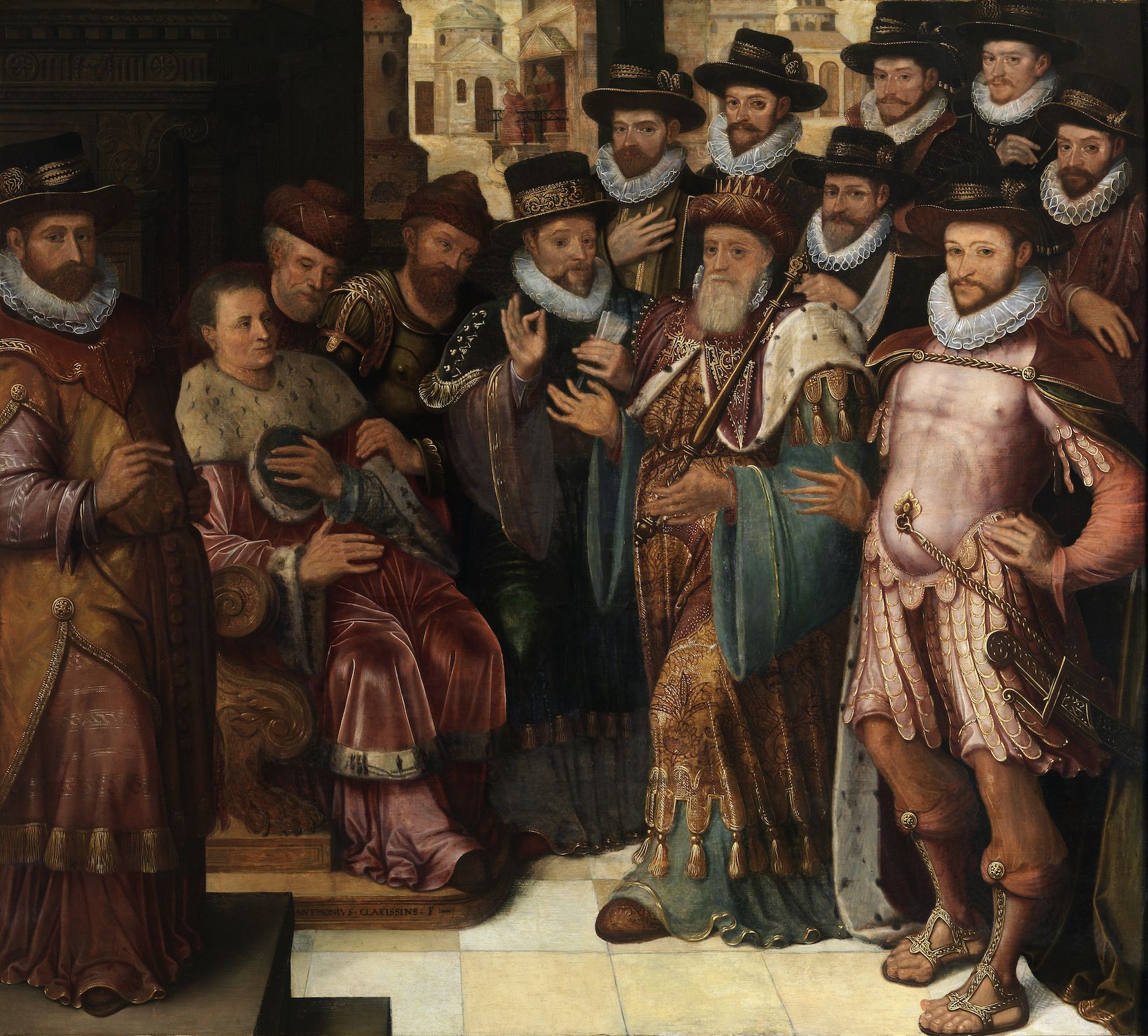
Oordeel van Cambyses. Gevangenneming van Sisamnes, Groeningemuseum. c. circa 1576 - circa 1600

Although a tax system existed during the reigns of Cyrus and Cambyses, it was not a systematic one, and thus the subjects of the king were either obligated to give gifts, or pay taxes. As was the case during his father's reign, Cambyses's satraps were all of Persian stock: Gubaru in Babylonia-Trans-Euphrates: Aryandes in Egypt: Oroetes in Sardis, Mitrobates in Dascylium, Dadarsi in Bactria, and Vivana in Arachosia. Likewise, the imperial treasurer in Babylon, Mithradata, was also from a Persian family. Indeed, the senior officials and officers accompanying Cambyses in Egypt were composed solely of Persians. The most notable of these Persians were relatives of the king, such as his cousin Darius, who occupied high offices under Cyrus and Cambyses, and serving as a spear-bearer under the latter. Darius's father, Hystaspes, served as the governor of Parthia and Hyrcania, or at least held a prominent role there. Important offices centred around the king was also occupied by the Persians, as in the case of Prexaspes, who served as the "message-bearer" of Cambyses, and Sisamnes, who was the royal judge but later executed by Cambyses.

== Personal life ==
According to Herodotus, Cambyses was labelled a "despot" by the Persians due to his being "half-mad, cruel, and insolent". However, this would seem to be part of later Persian and Egyptian propaganda critical of Cambyses. Indeed, due to Cambyses's willingness to consolidate authority to himself, the Persian tribal nobility were increasingly antagonistic towards him.

=== Marriages ===
In Achaemenid Persia, marriages between family members, such as half-siblings, nieces and cousins took place but were not seen as incestuous. However, Greek sources state that brother–sister and father–daughter marriages allegedly took place inside the royal family, yet it remains problematic to determine the reliability of these accounts. According to Herodotus, Cambyses supposedly married two of his sisters, Atossa and Roxane, against the advice of the royal judges. This would have been regarded as illegal. However, Herodotus also states that Cambyses married Otanes's daughter Phaidyme, whilst his contemporary Ctesias names Roxane as Cambyses's wife, but she is not referred to as his sister.

The accusations against Cambyses of committing incest are mentioned as part of his "blasphemous actions", which were designed to illustrate his "madness and vanity". These reports all derive from the same Egyptian source that was antagonistic towards Cambyses, and some of these allegations of "crimes", such as the killing of the Apis bull, have been confirmed as false, which means that the report of Cambyses's supposed incestuous acts is questionable.

According to Herodotus, one of the sister-wives of Cambyses had accompanied him in Egypt. At one point, this wife criticized him and, in a fit of rage, Cambyses killed her and her unborn child and almost killed the former king of Lydia, Croesus, who criticized him. The story highlights Cambyses's rejection of criticism, his incest, and his lack of self-control, and his lack of male offspring is the implicit punishment for his actions. As with other stories, this account is difficult, not least because Croesus had died shortly after the conquest of Lydia.

== Death and succession ==
In the spring of 522 BC, Cambyses hurriedly left Egypt to deal with a rebellion in Persia. Before he left the country, he made Egypt into a satrapy under the governorship of the Persian Aryandes.

According to Herodotus, Bardiya, or Smerdis as the historian calls him, had accompanied Cambyses in Egypt, only for the brother to pettily order him to return home. Soon after, Cambyses dreamed that his brother was sitting on the Persian throne and ordered a Persian, Prexaspes, to kill him, only to realize that his brother hadn't claimed the throne but someone who shared his name and was falsely claiming to be the real brother. Initially, Cambyses accused Prexaspes of ignoring the order, but when he learned that his brother had died, Cambyses set out to deal with the rebellion. However, like many of Herodotus's stories, this one contains issues and conveniently mirrors the account of Astyages and Harpagus in the story of the birth of Cyrus.

However, Cambyses died shortly after under disputed circumstances. By most accounts, while Cambyses was on his way through Syria (Eber-Nari), he received a wound to the thigh, which soon became gangrenous. Cambyses died three weeks later (in July) at a location called Agbatana, which is most likely the modern city of Hama. He died childless, and was succeeded by his younger brother Bardiya.

According to Darius, who was Cambyses's lance-bearer at the time, Bardiya decided that he could not succeed as King of Kings and died by his own hand in 522 BC. Herodotus and Ctesias ascribe his death to an accident. Ctesias writes that Cambyses, despondent from the loss of family members, stabbed himself in the thigh while working with a piece of wood, and died eleven days later from the wound. Herodotus's story is that while Cambyses was mounting his horse, the tip of his scabbard broke, and his sword pierced his thigh, incidentally in the very spot he had stabbed the Apis Bull. Some modern historians suspect that Cambyses was assassinated, either by Darius as the first step to usurping the empire for himself, or by supporters of Bardiya.

Cambyses was buried in Neyriz in southeastern Persis. As reported in the Persepolis Administrative Archives, sacrifices were offered in his name. At the time of Cambyses's death, the Achaemenid Empire was stronger than ever, reaching from Cyrenaica to the Hindu Kush, and from the Syr Darya to the Persian Gulf.

== Titles ==
Like the kings before and after him, Cambyses bore several regal titles, although no inscription of his remains. Known titles of Cambyses include "king of Upper and Lower Egypt" and "descendant of (the gods) Ra, Horus, Osiris," Pharaoh of Egypt, King of Babylon, and King of the Lands.

== Family tree ==
Cyrus family tree

Achaemenes King of Persia
Teispes King of Persia
Ariaramnes Ruler of Persia (Note: Unconfirmed rulers, due to the Behistun Inscription)	Cyrus I Ruler of Anshan
Arsames Ruler of Persia	Cambyses I Ruler of Anshan
Hystaspes Prince	Cyrus the Great (Cyrus II) King of Persia
Darius the Great (Darius I) King of Persia	Cambyses II King of Persia	Bardiya (Smerdis) Prince (imposter Gaumata ruled as Smerdis)	Artystone Princess	Atossa Princess

== See also ==
- Cambysene
- Cambyses Romance

== Sources ==
- Briant, Pierre (2002). From Cyrus to Alexander: A History of the Persian Empire. Eisenbrauns. ISBN 978-1575060316.
- Brosius, Maria (2000). "Women i. In Pre-Islamic Persia". Encyclopaedia Iranica, Vol. London et al.: Encyclopaedia Iranica Foundation. Archived from the original on 2020-03-13.
- Brosius, Maria (2021). A History of Ancient Persia: The Achaemenid Empire. John Wiley & Sons. ISBN 978-1444350920.
- Dandamayev, Muhammad A. (2000). "Achaemenid taxation". Encyclopaedia Iranica.
- Dandamayev, Muhammad A. (1993). "Cyrus iii. Cyrus II The Great". Encyclopaedia Iranica, Vol. IV, Fasc. 7. pp. 516–521.
- Dandamayev, Muhammad A. (1990). "Cambyses II". Encyclopaedia Iranica, Vol. IV, Fasc. 7. pp. 726–729.
- Jacobs, Bruno; Rollinger, Robert (2021). A Companion to the Achaemenid Persian Empire. John Wiley & Sons. ISBN 978-1119174288.
- Llewellyn-Jones, Lloyd (2017). "The Achaemenid Empire". In Daryaee, Touraj (ed.). King of the Seven Climes: A History of the Ancient Iranian World (3000 BCE - 651 CE). UCI Jordan Center for Persian Studies. pp. 1–236. ISBN 9780692864401.
- Schwab, Andreas; Schütze, Alexander (2023). Herodotean soundings: the Cambyses "logos". Tübingen: Narr Francke Attempto. ISBN 9783823383291.
- Van De Mieroop, Marc (2003). A History of the Ancient Near East. Blackwell History of the Ancient World. Hoboken, NJ: Wiley. ISBN 978-0-631-22552-2. JSTOR 25608373.
- Strassler, Robert B. The Landmark Herodotus: The Histories. Anchor Books, 2009.
- Waerzeggers, Caroline; Seire, Maarja (2018). Xerxes and Babylonia: The Cuneiform Evidence. Peeters Publishers.

Cambyses II Achaemenid dynasty Died: 522 BC
Preceded by Cyrus the Great	King of Kings of Persia; 530–522 BC	Succeeded by Bardiya
Preceded by Psamtik III	Pharaoh of Egypt; XXVII Dynasty; 525–522 BC	Succeeded by Bardiya
