= Josef Wiesehöfer =

German classical historian (born 1951)

Josef Wiesehöfer (born April 5, 1951 in Wickede, North Rhine-Westphalia) is a German classical scholar and former professor of Ancient history at the Department of Classics of the University of Kiel.

Wiesehöfer obtained his doctorate at the University of Münster in 1977 with a thesis on the Persian Great King Darius I and the pretender to the throne Gaumata. After completing his dissertation, Wiesehöfer worked for nine years as a research assistant to Ruth Altheim-Stiehl in Münster, followed by three years at the Fernuniversität Hagen. In 1988, he completed his habilitation at the University of Heidelberg with a study on the early Hellenistic period. In 1989, he was appointed professor of Ancient history at the University of Kiel, where he worked until his retirement in 2016.

Wiesehöfer gained international renown primarily through his work on pre-Islamic Persia under the Achaemenid, Seleucid, Arsacid and Sasanid dynasties, which has been published in numerous languages, including English, French and Italian. Wiesehöfer is committed to reintegrating the study of the Ancient Near East back into ancient history. In addition to ancient Iran, Wiesehöfer's research interests focus primarily on the contacts between the Greco-Roman world and its eastern neighbours. In 2006, he organised an international conference on the Greek author Ctesias of Cnidus, who wrote an influential work on the Achaemenid Empire in the 4th century BCE. Wiesehöfer is also active in the field of the history of science; in 2005, he edited an anthology on Theodor Mommsen.

Wiesehöfer has published over 250 specialist articles in German and English and is (co-)editor of various publication series (e.g. Oriens et Occidens, Achaemenid History, Oikumene) and author of numerous monographs, among which Das antike Persien (Düsseldorf/Zurich 1993) is internationally regarded as a standard work and has been reprinted several times and translated into several languages, including English (Ancient Persia, London 1996).

Wiesehöfer is a member of the board of the Corpus Inscriptionum Iranicarum (London), an ordinary member of the German Archaeological Institute and a corresponding member of the Philological-Historical Class of the Göttingen Academy of Sciences and Humanities. He was a member of the Commission for Ancient History and Epigraphy (AEK) and principal investigator of the Kiel Graduate School Human Development in Landscapes. In 2012, he was accepted as a full member of the Academia Europaea.

== Publications ==
=== Books ===
- Der Aufstand Gaumātas und die Anfänge Dareios' I. Bonn 1978.
- Athen und Rom: Polis und Metropole. Paderborn 1985.
- Die Anfänge von Literalität und Textualität in Europa: Das Alphabet und die Folgen in griechischer Zeit. Hagen 1987.
- Die „dunklen Jahrhunderte“ der Persis. Untersuchungen zu Geschichte und Kultur von Fārs in frühhellenistischer Zeit (330–140 v. Chr.). Munich 1994.
- Ancient Persia. London 1996.
- Iraniens, Grecs et Romains. Paris 2005.

=== Selected papers ===
- Die 'Freunde' und 'Wohltäter' des Großkönigs. In: Studia Iranica 9, 1980, pp. 7–21.
- Geteilte Loyalitäten. Religiöse Minderheiten des 3. und 4. Jahrhunderts im Spannungsfeld zwischen Rom und dem sasanidischen Iran. In: Klio 75, 1993, pp. 362–382.
- "King of Kings" and "Philhellên": Kingship in Arsacid Iran. In: Per Bilde etc. (eds.): Aspects of Hellenistic Kingship, Aarhus 1996, pp. 55–66.
- Dekadenz, Krise oder überraschendes Ende? Überlegungen zum Zusammenbruch der Perserherrschaft. In: Helmut Altrichter u. a. (eds.): Das Ende von Großreichen, Erlangen/Jena 1996, pp. 39–64.
- Gebete für die ‚Urahnen‘ oder: Wann und wie verschwanden Kyros und Dareios aus der Tradition Irans?. In: Electrum 6, 2002, pp. 111–117.
- Rūm as Enemy of Iran. In: Erich S. Gruen (ed.): Cultural Borrowings and Ethnic Appropriations in Antiquity, Stuttgart 2005, pp. 105–120.
- King, Court and Royal Representation in the Sasanian Empire. In: Antony Spawforth (ed.): The Court and Court Society in Ancient Monarchies, Cambridge 2007, pp. 58–81.
- The Late Sasanian Near East. In: Chase Robinson (ed.): The New Cambridge History of Islam 1, Cambridge 2010, pp. 98–152.
- Polybios und die Entstehung des römischen Weltreicheschemas. In: Volker Grieb etc. (eds.): Polybios und seine Historien, Stuttgart 2013, pp. 59–70.
- Greek Poleis in the Near East and Their Parthian Overlords. In: Adam Kemezis (ed.): Urban Dreams and Realities, Boston/Leiden 2015, pp. 328–346.
- Women of the Sassanid Dynasty (224-651 CE). In: Sabine Müller etc. (eds.): The Routledge Companion to Women and Monarchy in the Ancient Mediterranean World, New York 2021, pp. 246–255.
