= Bardiya =

Son of Cyrus the Great (died c. 522 BC)

Bardiya 𐎲𐎼𐎮𐎡𐎹
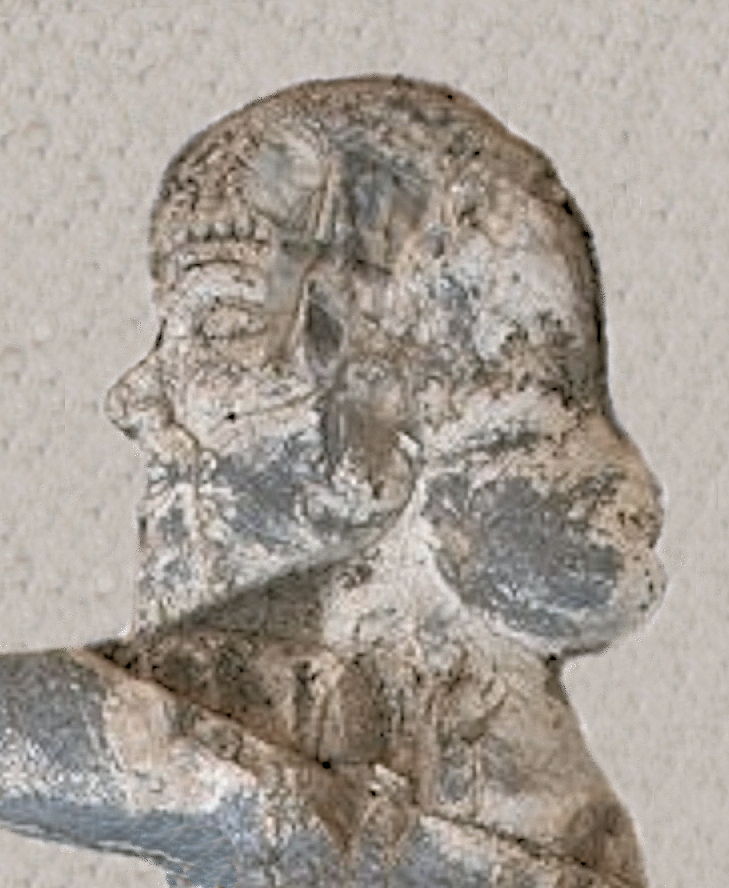
- Portrait of the Achaemenid ruler toppled by Darius, as appearing on the Behistun inscription: he was either the legitimate Bardiya, or, as claimed by Darius, an imposter named Gaumāta.

King of Kings of the Achaemenid Empire, Pharaoh of Egypt
- Reign: 522 BC
- Predecessor: Cambyses II
- Successor: Darius the Great
- Burial: 522 BC
- Spouse: Phaedymia
- Issue: Parmys
- Dynasty: Achaemenid (Teispid)
- Father: Cyrus the Great
- Mother: Cassandane
- Religion: Ancient Iranian religion

Bardiya or Smerdis (Old Persian: 𐎲𐎼𐎮𐎡𐎹 Bardiya; Ancient Greek: Σμέρδις Smérdis; possibly died 522 BCE), also named as Tanyoxarces (Old Persian: *Tanūvazraka; Ancient Greek: Τανυοξάρκης Tanuoxárkēs) by Ctesias, was a son of Cyrus the Great and the younger brother of Cambyses II, both Persian kings. There are sharply divided views on his life. Bardiya either ruled the Achaemenid Empire for a few months in 522 BCE, or was impersonated by a magus called Gaumata (Old Persian: 𐎥𐎢𐎶𐎠𐎫 Gaumāta), whose name is given by Ctesias as Sphendadates (Old Persian: *Spantadātah; Ancient Greek: Σφενδαδάτης Sphendadátēs), until he was toppled by Darius the Great.

== Name and sources ==
The prince's name is listed variously in the historical sources. In Darius the Great's Behistun inscription, his Persian name is Bardiya or Bardia. Herodotus calls him Smerdis, which is the prevalent Greek form of his name; the Persian name has been assimilated to the Greek (Asiatic) name Smerdis or Smerdies, a name which also occurs in the poems of Alcaeus and Anacreon. Bardiya is called Tanyoxarces by Ctesias, who also names Gaumāta as Sphendadates; he is called Tanooxares by Xenophon, who takes the name from Ctesias, and he is called Mergis and Merdis by Justin and Merdis by Aeschylus.

In English-language histories he has traditionally been called Smerdis, following Herodotus' example, but recent histories tend to call him Bardiya.

== Traditional view ==
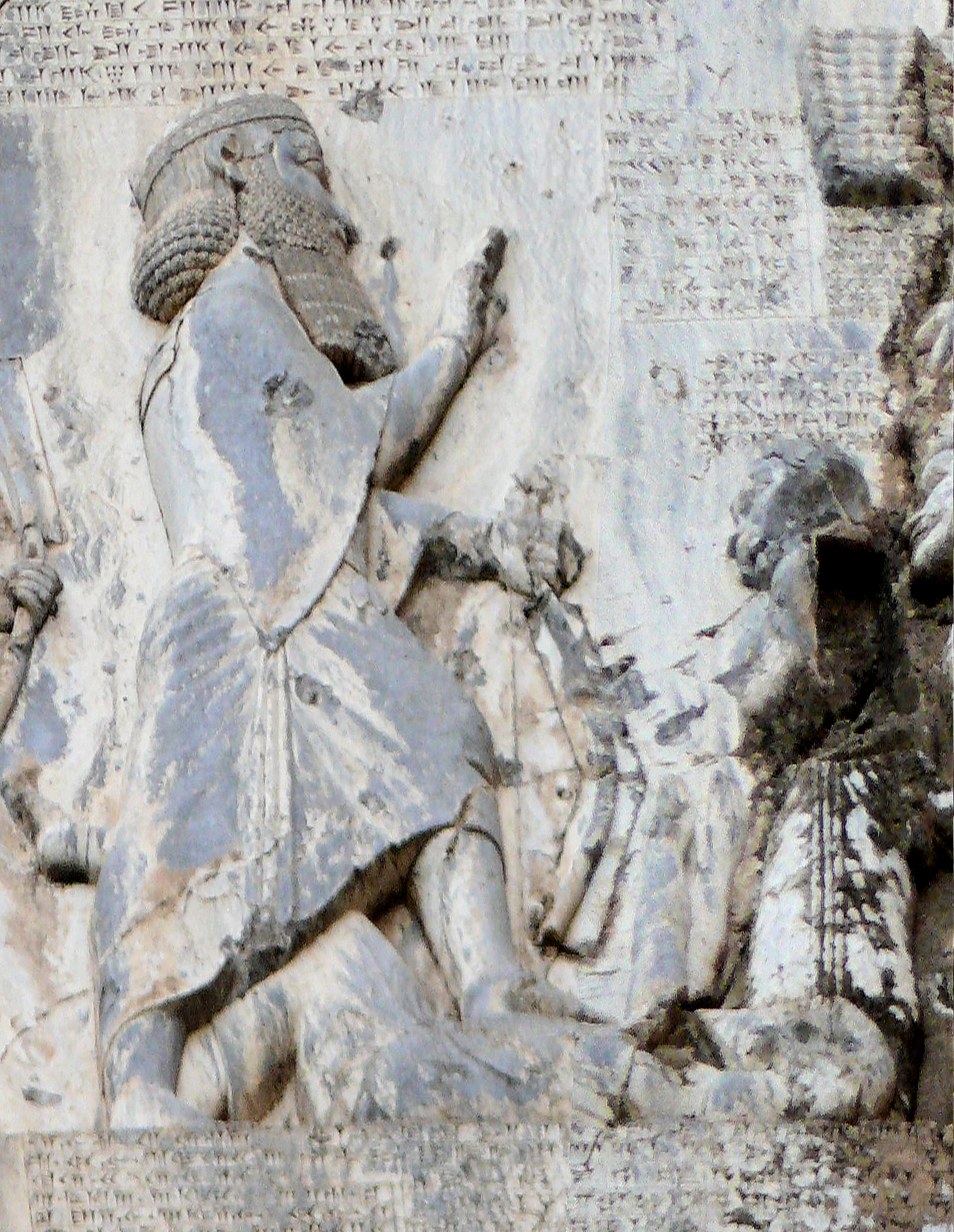
Gaumata under the boot of Darius the Great, from the Behistun inscription in Kermanshah

The traditional view is based on several ancient sources, including the Behistun inscription as well as Herodotus, in Ctesias, and Justin, although there are minor differences among them. The three oldest surviving sources agree that Gaumata/Pseudo-Smerdis/Sphendadates was overthrown by Darius and others in a coup d'état, and that Darius then ascended the throne. Most sources (including Darius himself, Herodotus and Ctesias) have Darius as part of a group of seven conspirators. In Greek and Latin sources, Darius subsequently gained kingship by cheating in a contest.

Bardiya was the younger son of Cyrus the Great and a full or half-brother of Cambyses II. According to Ctesias, on his deathbed Cyrus appointed Bardiya as satrap (governor) of some of the far-eastern provinces. According to Darius the Great, Cambyses II, after becoming king of Persia but before setting out for Egypt, killed Bardiya and kept this secret. However, according to Herodotus (who gives two detailed stories), Bardiya went to Egypt with Cambyses and was there for some time but later Cambyses sent him back to Susa out of envy, because "Bardiya alone could draw the bow brought from the Ethiopian king." Herodotus then states that "Cambyses had a dream in which he saw his brother sitting on the royal throne. As a result of this dream Cambyses sent his trusted counselor Prexaspes from Egypt to Susa with the order to kill Smerdis" (i.e., Bardiya).

Bardiya's death was not known to the people, and so in the spring of 522 BC, a usurper pretended to be him and proclaimed himself king on a mountain near the Persian town of Paishiyauvada. Darius claimed that the real name of the usurper was Gaumata, a Magian priest from Media; this name has been preserved by Justin but given to his brother (called Patizeithes by Herodotus), who is said to have been the real promoter of the intrigue. According to Herodotus, the name of the Magian usurper was Oropastes, but according to Ctesias it was Sphendadates.

The despotic rule of Cambyses, coupled with his long absence in Egypt, contributed to the fact that "the whole people, Persians, Medes and all the other nations," acknowledged the usurper, especially as he granted a tax relief for three years. Cambyses began to march against him, but died in the spring of 522 BC in disputed circumstances. Before his death he confessed to the murder of his brother, and publicly explained the whole fraud, but this was not generally believed. Nobody had the courage to oppose the new king, who ruled for seven months over the whole empire. The new king transferred the seat of government to Media. A number of Persian nobles discovered that their new ruler was an impostor, and a group of seven nobles formed a plot to kill him. In September 522 BC they surprised him at a castle in Nisa (on the Nisaean plain) and stabbed him to death. One of the seven, Darius, was proclaimed as ruler shortly after.

While the primary sources do not agree on the names and many other details, the three oldest surviving sources (Darius himself, Herodotus and Ctesias) all portray Gaumata/Pseudo-Smerdis/Sphendadates as an imposter who usurped the throne by posing as one of the sons of Cyrus the Great, i.e. as one of the brothers of Cambyses II. In Darius' trilingual Behistun inscription, the prince being impersonated is named "Pirtiya" in Elamite, "Bardiya" in Old Persian, and "Barziya" in Akkadian. In Herodotus' Histories, the prince and his imposter have the same name (Smerdis). For Ctesias, Sphendadates poses as 'Tanyoxarces'. Other Greek sources have various other names for the figure being impersonated, including 'Tanoxares', 'Mergis' and 'Mardos'.

=== In Herodotus' Histories ===
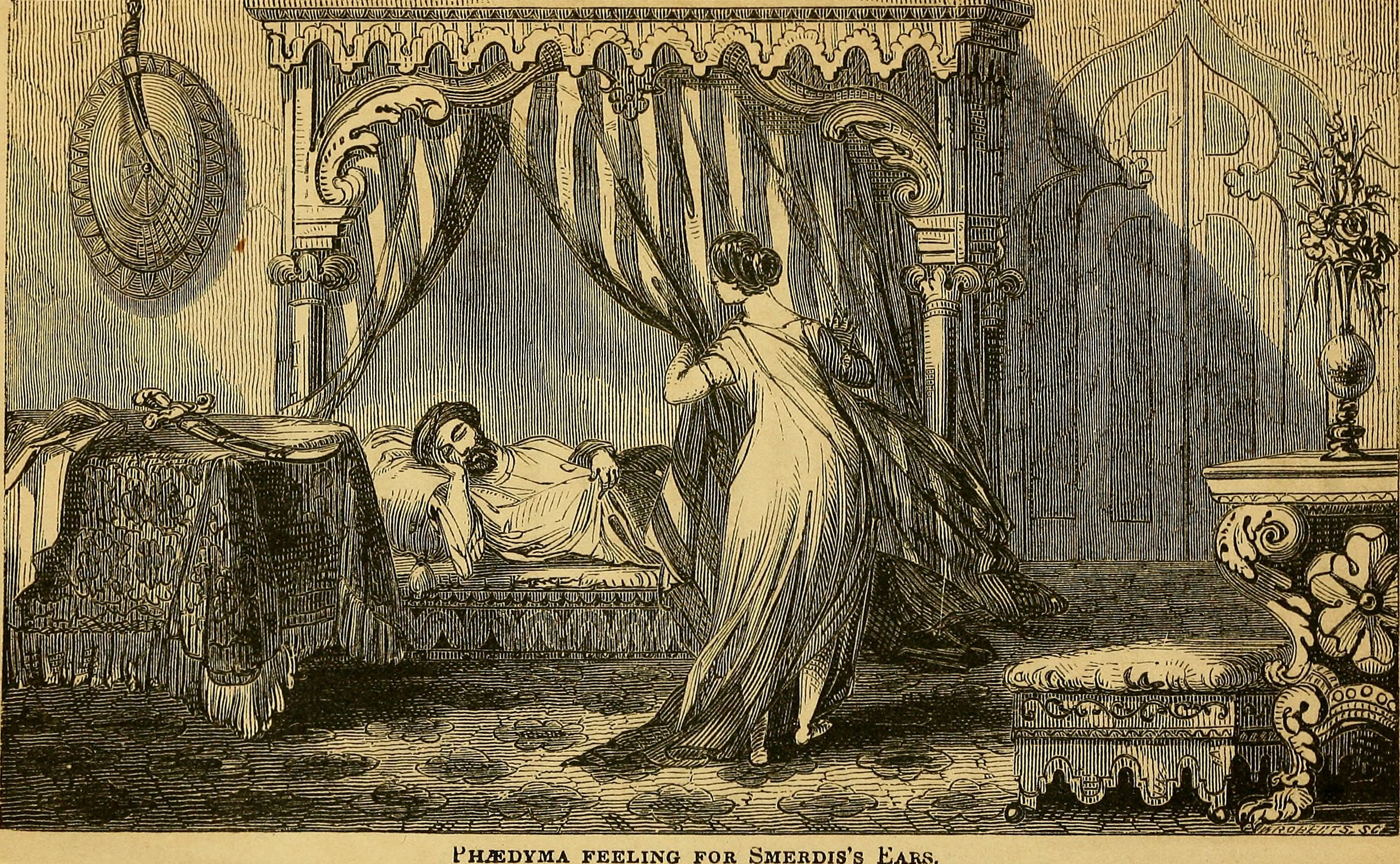
Phaedyme is sent by her father Otanes, to check if King Smerdis has ears under his turban, as the suspected imposter was known to have had them cut off in punishment for a crime. She found that indeed the king did not have ears anymore, which proved that he was an imposter, and justified the coup in favour of Darius I.

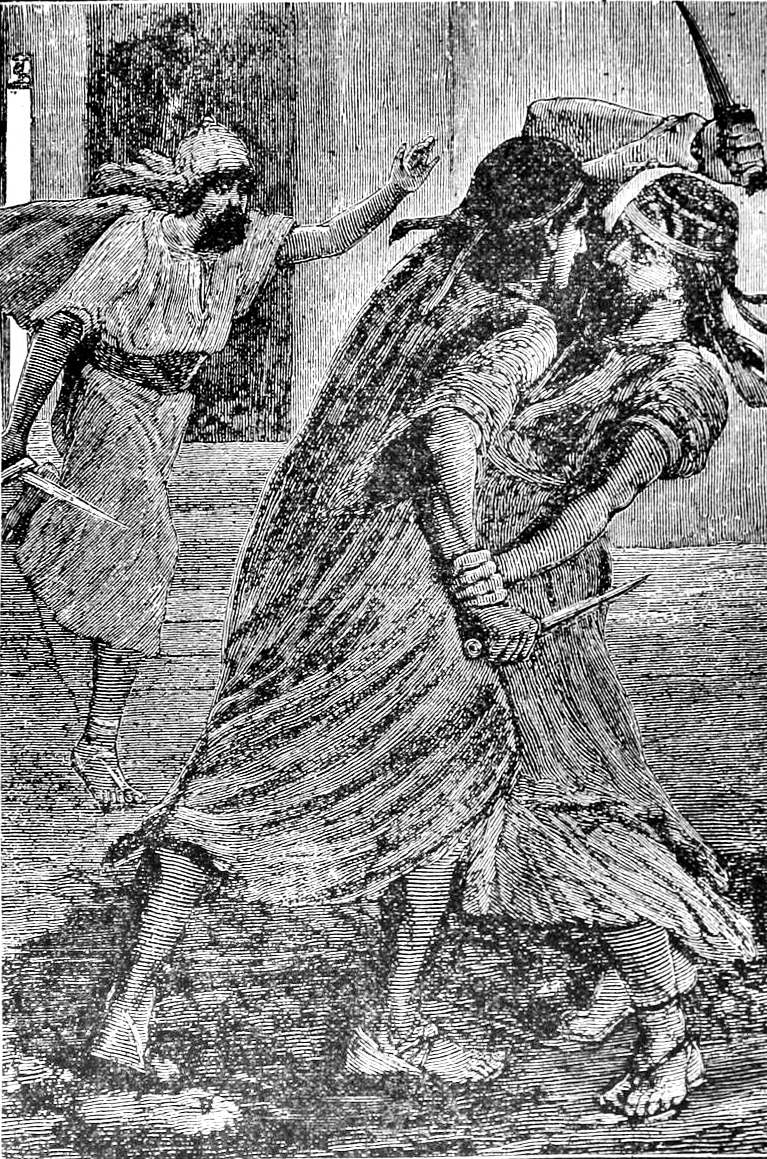
"The struggle between Gobryas and the false Smerdis", 19th century print.

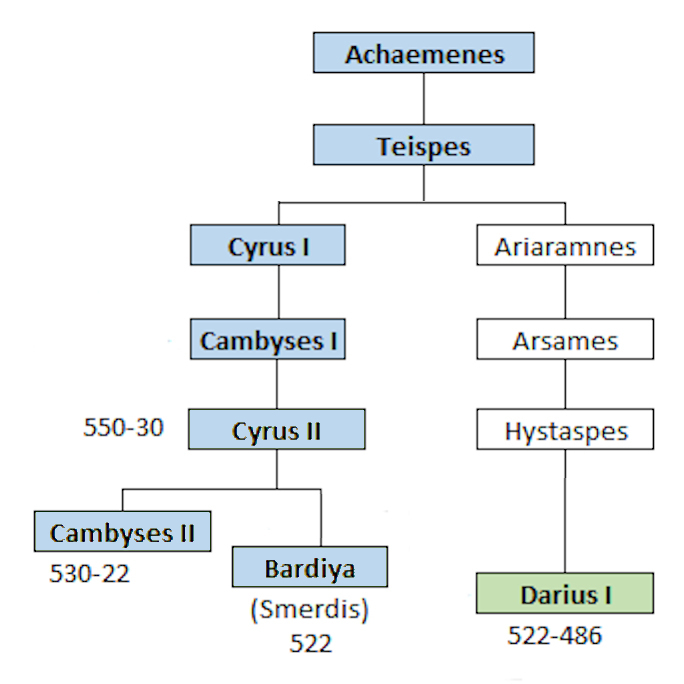
Bardiya / Smerdis in relation to his successor Darius the Great in the Achaemenid lineage.

A longer version of the story appears in Book 3 of Herodotus' Histories, written c. 450 BC. That story there (3.1–38, 3.61–88) can be roughly summarized as follows:

While in Egypt, Cambyses wounds the thigh of the sacred bull worshipped as the god Apis, and when the sacred bull dies from the wound, Cambyses loses his already tenuous grasp on sanity (3.27–3.30). Jealous of his brother Smerdis' skill with a particular bow brought from the king of Ethiopia, Cambyses sends Smerdis back to Persis. Cambyses then has a dream in which Smerdis would supplant him, so he sends a henchman to murder him secretly (3.30). The assassination succeeds and is meant to be kept secret.

One of the few that know of Smerdis' death is Patizeithes, the steward of Cambyses' palace at Susa. That steward has a brother who greatly resembles Smerdis in appearance, and whose name is also Smerdis (3.61.1). The steward then puts his brother on the throne, and has him pretend that he is the brother of Cambyses. The false Smerdis succeeds in the deception by not allowing anyone who knew the real Smerdis into his presence (3.61).

Still in Egypt, Cambyses learns of the false Smerdis, and knowing that the real Smerdis is dead, recognises the deception. Cambyses then readies his army to return to Susa, but while mounting his horse accidentally injures his thigh with the point of his sword. Cambyses dies from the wound a few days later (3.63–3.66). On his death bed, Cambyses perceives Smerdis as favouring a return to Median hegemony (3.65). The false Smerdis then continues to rule at Susa for some time, and gains support from everyone except the Persians when he grants a three-year military draft and tax exemption to the various peoples of the empire (3.67).

Meanwhile, Otanes, a nobleman of Persis, suspects that the king is not the brother of Cambyses, but rather the Smerdis whose ears Cyrus had commanded be cut off "for some grave reason" (3.69.6). To confirm his suspicion, Otanes asks his daughter Phaedymia – who is a member of the harem and thus has access to the king – to check whether the man has ears. Phaidyme does as asked, and one night while the king is asleep, confirms that the king does not in fact have ears. His suspicions confirmed, Otanes then gathers six noblemen and plots to get rid of the false Smerdis. A seventh nobleman, Darius, arrives at the capital shortly thereafter, and is then included in the group. The seven conspirators charge into the chambers of the king, and while five deal with the guards, Darius and Megabyzus kill the false Smerdis and a companion.

Five days later, after the tumult has died down, the seven meet again to discuss a suitable form of government (3.80–82). After some discussion over the merits of democracy (proposed by Otanes) and oligarchy (proposed by Megabyzus) and monarchy (proposed by Darius), four of the seven vote in favour of a monarchy. They then decide to hold a contest whereby whichever of them got his horse to neigh first after sunrise shall become king. Darius cheats and ascends the throne (3.84–3.87).

=== In Ctesias' Persica ===
Ctesias' version (c. 400 BC) runs as follows (XI/F9.8 and XII/F13.11-17, via Photius Bibl. 72):

King Cyrus, as he lay dying, appointed his elder son, Cambyses, to the throne and appointed his younger son, Tanyoxarces, governor of the provinces of Bactria, Chorasmia, Parthia, and Carmania. Shortly after Cambyses ascends the throne, a certain Sphendadates who had been whipped by Tanyoxarces for some offence, informs Cambyses that his brother is plotting against him. As proof of this he declares that Tanyoxarces would refuse to come if summoned.

When Tanyoxarces does not immediately accede to the summons, Cambyses begins to believe Sphendadates, who then begins to slander Tanyoxarces more freely. By the time Tanyoxarces finally arrives, Cambyses is determined to put him to death, but hesitates. Sphendadates suggests that, since he (Sphendadates) looks very much like Tanyoxarces, he could take the prince's place. Cambyses agrees, and Tanyoxarces is killed by being forced to drink bull's blood. Sphendadates then takes the place as governor of the eastern provinces.

Five years later, while in Babylon, Cambyses accidentally wounds himself in the thigh, and dies eleven days later. Upon hearing of Cambyses death, Sphendadates (alias Tanyoxarces) returns to the capital and succeeds Cambyses. Meanwhile, Izabates, a confidant of Cambyses who knew of the killing of Tanyoxarces, is on his way with the body of Cambyses. Upon arriving at the capital and finding Sphendadates on the throne, Izabates exposes the fraud. Then, seven noblemen (among them Darius) conspire against Sphendadates. The seven are admitted to the palace by a co-conspirator, where Sphendadates is then killed. The seven then decide to hold a contest whereby whichever of them got his horse to neigh first after sunrise shall become king. Darius gets his horse to be the first to neigh (F13.17: "the result of a cunning stratagem") and he ascends the throne.

== Modern view ==
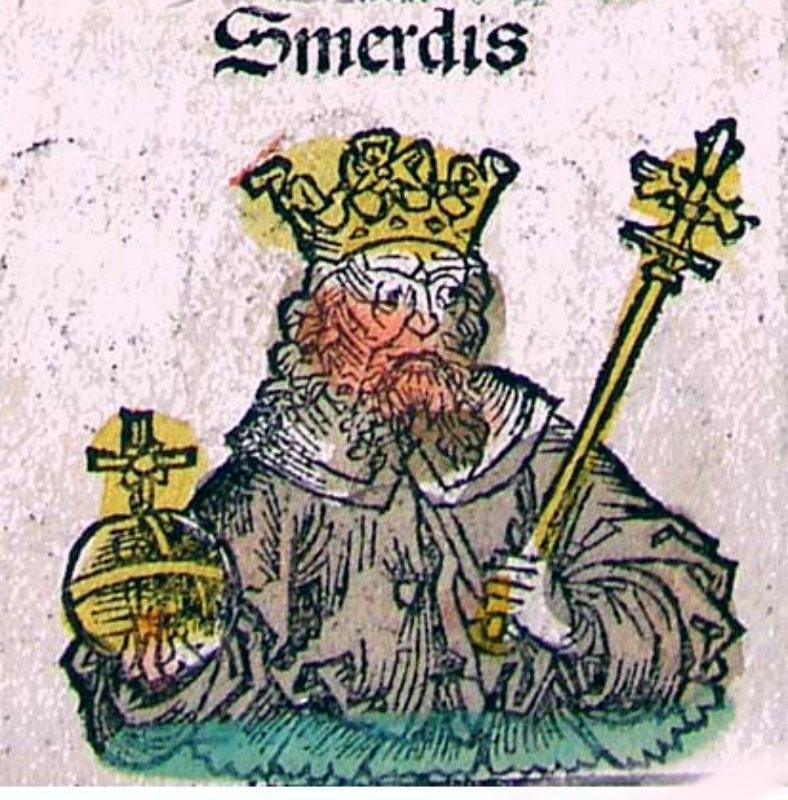
Medieval image of Smerdis.

Most modern historians do not consider Darius' version of events convincing, and assume that the person who ruled for a few months was Bardiya, the real son of Cyrus, and that the story of his impersonation by a magus was an invention of Darius to justify his seizure of the throne.

Shahbazi describes this view as a "fantasy of revisionist historians fond of sensationalism", and according to Dandamayev it "must remain hypothetical". However, the idea that Gaumata was a fabrication is nonetheless appealing because "it was vital for a man like Darius, who had no particular rights to the throne, to invent a character (Gaumata) condemned for his acts against gods and men." There are some implausibilities in the official story, e.g. the impostor resembled the real Bardiya so closely that most of his wives did not spot the difference, except for queen Phaidyme. Darius often accused rebels and opponents of being impostors (such as Nebuchadnezzar III) and it could be straining credulity to say that they all were.

== Aftermath ==
In the next year, another person claiming to be Bardiya, named Vahyazdāta (Old Persian: 𐎺𐏃𐎹𐏀𐎭𐎠𐎫) rose against Darius in eastern Persia and met with great success, but he was finally defeated, taken prisoner and executed. Perhaps he is identical with the King Maraphis "the Maraphii" who occurs as successor in the list of Persian kings given by Aeschylus.

The real Bardiya had only one daughter, called Parmys, who eventually married Darius the Great.

Some contracts dating from his reign have been found in Babylonia, where his name is spelt Barziya or Bardiya. Darius says that Bardiya destroyed some temples, which Darius later restored. Bardiya also took away the herds and houses of the people, which Darius corrected once he gained the throne.

The death of the false Bardiya was annually celebrated in Persia by a feast called "the killing of the magian," (Magiophani) at which no magian was allowed to show himself.

== Bardiya in fiction ==
This episode is dealt with by Gore Vidal in his historical novel Creation (1981). The fictional narrator is a Persian nobleman in the court of Darius the Great who learns that the person who ruled for a few months was the real Bardiya.

An "impostor Magian Smerdis" is mentioned in the 1940 short story by Jorge Luis Borges, Tlön, Uqbar, Orbis Tertius. In the story, a reader discovers an article on a fictitious nation in an otherwise ordinary encyclopedia volume. Smerdis is the only historical figure that the protagonist recognizes. The narrator of the story mentions that the name is invoked in the article as a metaphor more than anything else.

Bardiya Achaemenid dynasty Died: 522 BC
Preceded by Cambyses II	King of Kings of Persia; 522 BC	Succeeded by Darius the Great
Preceded by Cambyses II	Pharaoh of Egypt; XXVII Dynasty; 522 BC	Succeeded by Darius the Great
