= Battle of Pelusium =

525 BC battle between Egypt and Achaemenid Empire

- Part of the First Achaemenid conquest of Egypt
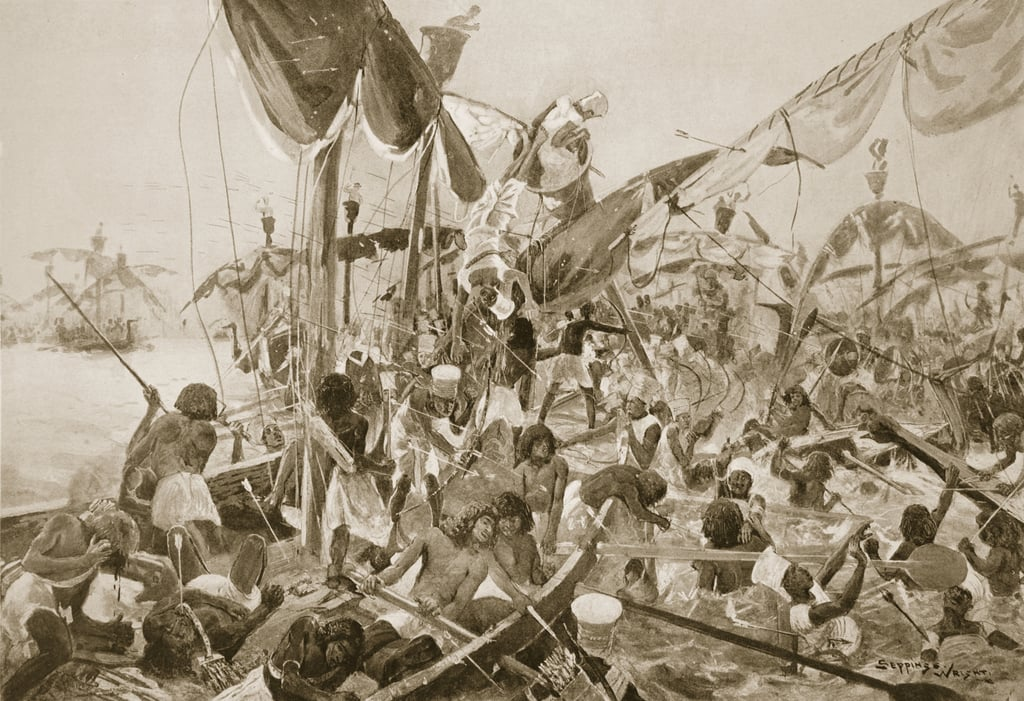
- Henry Charles Seppings-Wrightː The Sea Fight at Pelusium (Hutchinson's History of the Nations, 1922)
Date	525 BC
Location	Pelusium, Egypt 31.041667°N 32.545°E
Result	Persian victory
Territorial changes	Egypt annexed by the Achaemenid Empire

Belligerents
Achaemenid Empire; Arabian and Greek mercenaries	Kingdom of Egypt; Karian and Ionian mercenaries

Commanders and leaders
Cambyses II	Psamtik III (POW)

Casualties and losses
7,000 (Ctesias)	50,000 (Ctesias)
- Location of the Battle of Pelusium.

The Battle of Pelusium was the first major battle between the Achaemenid Empire and Egypt. This decisive battle transferred the throne of the Pharaohs to Cambyses II of Persia, marking the beginning of the Achaemenid Twenty-seventh Dynasty of Egypt. It was fought in 525 BC near Pelusium, an important city in the eastern extremes of Egypt's Nile Delta, 30 km to the south-east of the modern Port Said. The battle was preceded and followed by sieges at Gaza and Memphis.

== Background ==
=== Herodotus on motives and background ===
The most common recounting of the events leading to the battle of Pelusium is from Greek historians, particularly Herodotus. According to Herodotus, the conflict between the Pharaoh Amasis II of Egypt and Cambyses II of Persia was a gradual process involving multiple personalities, mostly Egyptians. According to Herodotus, an Egyptian physician was requested by Cambyses from Amasis on good terms, to which Amasis complied. The physician (most likely an ancient ophthalmologist) resented the forced labour that Amasis had imposed on him, and in retaliation, persuaded Cambyses to ask of Amasis a daughter in marriage, knowing how Amasis would dislike losing his daughter to a Persian. Cambyses complied, requesting the hand of the daughter of Amasis in marriage.

Amasis, unable to let go of his offspring, and unwilling to start a conflict with the Persians, instead sent an Egyptian girl named Nitetis, who was a daughter of an Egyptian named Apries. According to Herodotus, Apries was the previous pharaoh whom Amasis had defeated and killed, and whose daughter was now to be sent in place of Amasis's own offspring. Once greeted by Cambyses as "the daughter of Amasis", Nitetis explained the trickery employed by Amasis to avoid giving away his own daughter to the king. This infuriated Cambyses, who vowed to avenge the insult.

According to Herodotus, another motivation that solidified Cambyses's expedition into Egypt was Phanes of Halicarnassus. Originally a council man and advisor to Amasis, an unknown course of events led to bitterness developing between them to the point that Amasis sent an Egyptian eunuch after Phanes, pursuing him to Lydia. Phanes was captured in Lycia but outwitted his guards by getting them drunk and escaped to Persia, and assisted the Persian king in all manners of strategy, and was instrumental in shaping his resolve for conquest of Egypt.

Despite having full control over the Neo-Babylonian empire and its sub-regions including northern Arabia, Cambyses sent a message to the King of Arabia requesting safe passage through the desert road from Gaza to Pelusium. The Arabian king, himself an enemy of Amasis and glad to facilitate his destruction, granted safe passage to Cambyses and even supplied him with troops.

=== Siege of Gaza ===
According to Polybius, even with all the precautions taken on entering the border of Egypt, only the city of Gaza (525bc) resisted the Persians, which fell after a long siege.

=== Preparations for the battle ===
When the news of the impending battle reached Egypt, Psamtik III (Psammenitus), son and heir of Amasis II, gathered the Egyptian army, stationing it along the fork of the Red Sea and the river Nile. Amasis himself had died six months before Cambyses reached Egypt.

Psamtik had hoped that Egypt would be able to withstand the threat of the Persian attack by an alliance with the Greeks, but this hope failed, as the Cypriot towns and the tyrant Polycrates of Samos, who possessed a large fleet, now preferred to join the Persians. That one of Egypt's most prominent tactical advisers, Phanes of Halicarnassus, had already gone over to the Persian side meant that Psamtik was entirely dependent on his own limited military experience. Polycrates sent 40 triremes to the Persians. Psamtik, in a violent act of revenge prior to the confrontation with the Persian army, arrested all the sons of Phanes and stood them between two bowls. He then cut them one by one, draining their blood and mixing it with wine. Psamtik then drank of it and made every other councilman drink their blood before the battles.

== Battle ==
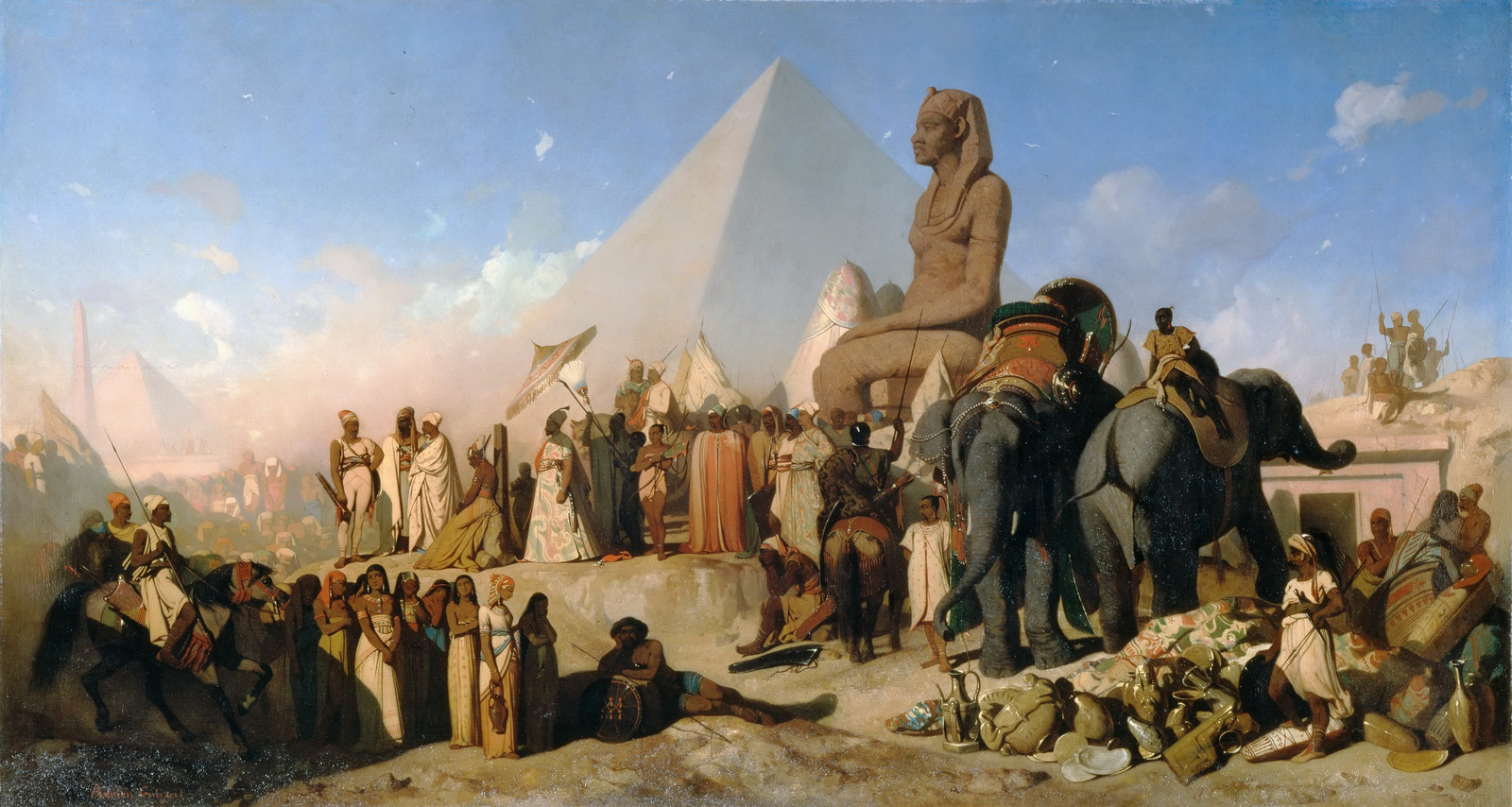
Meeting Between Cambyses II and Psammetichus III, after the Battle of Pelusium, by the French painter Adrien Guignet

The decisive military conflict happened at Pelusium. As Herodotus describes a sea of skulls at the Nile basin, upon the remnants of which he remarks on the differences between the Persian and the Egyptian heads. According to Ctesias, fifty thousand Egyptians fell, whereas the entire loss on the Persian side was only seven thousand. After this short struggle, the troops of Psamtik fled, and soon the retreat became a complete rout. Disoriented, and fleeing, the Egyptians took shelter in Memphis. The Egyptians were now besieged in their stronghold of Memphis.

== Aftermath ==
According to Herodotus, Cambyses, in a last attempt to bring an end to the struggle, sent a Persian herald in a ship to exhort the Egyptians to give up before further bloodshed. Upon sighting the Persian vessel at the port of Memphis, the Egyptians ran out, attacking the ship and killing every man in it, carrying their torn limbs with them back to the city. As Cambyses advanced to Memphis, it is said that for every Mytilenian killed during the siege of Memphis (525bc), ten Egyptians died, which makes the number of dead Egyptians two thousand, who may have been executed at the time or after the siege, because two hundred Mytileneans were killed. Pelusium probably surrendered itself immediately after the battle. The pharaoh was captured after the fall of Memphis and allowed to live under Persian watch. He later committed suicide after attempting a revolt against the Persians.

== Herodotus on the battle ==
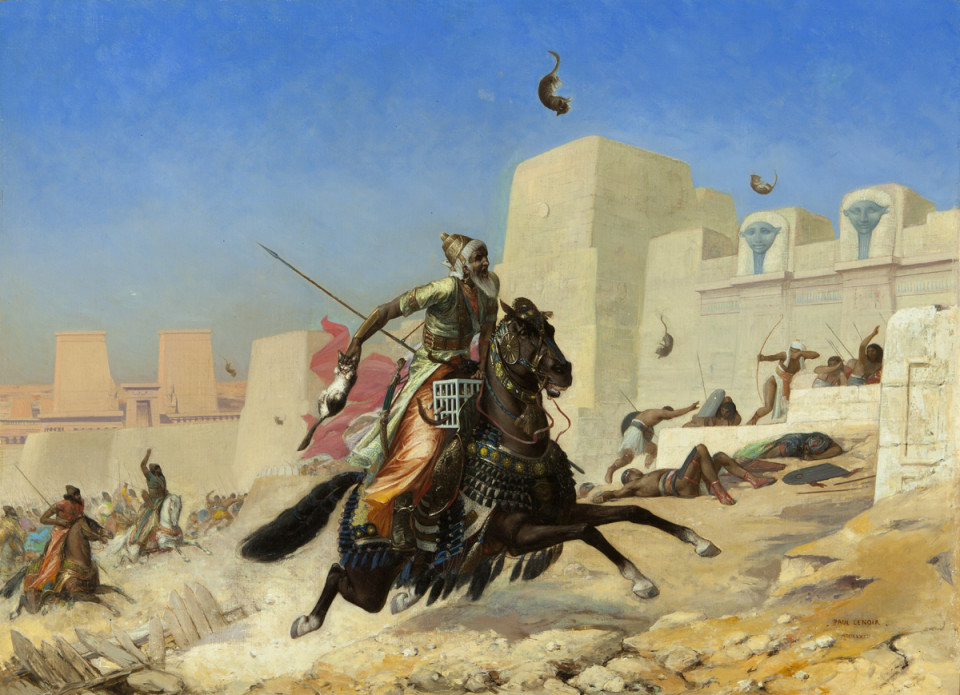
According to Polyaenus, the Persian soldiers allegedly used cats - among other sacred Egyptian animals - against the Pharaoh's army. Painting by French painter Paul-Marie Lenoir, 1872.

The fields around were strewn with the bones of the combatants when Herodotus visited. He noted that the skulls of the Egyptians were distinguishable from those of the Persians by their superior hardness, a fact confirmed he said by the mummies, and which he ascribed to the Egyptians' shaving their heads from infancy, and to the Persians covering them up with folds of cloth or linen.

Polyaenus, "a retired Macedonian general more interested in novelty than historical accuracy," claims that, according to legend, Cambyses captured Pelusium by using a clever strategy. The Egyptians regarded certain animals, especially cats, as being sacred (they had a cat goddess named Bastet), and would not injure them on any account. Polyaenus claims that Cambyses had his men carry the "sacred" animals in front of them to the attack. The Egyptians did not dare to shoot their arrows for fear of wounding the animals, and so Pelusium was stormed successfully. This would be an early form of psychological warfare. Polyaenus was the first to mention such a strategy, and was writing 700 years after the event.

Herodotus, however, makes no mention of any such strategy, and "gives hardly any information" about the fighting in general. According to Herodotus, Cambyses initially behaved with a certain moderation, sparing the son of Psamtik due to feeling "a touch of pity", but later, dissatisfied with his victory and unable to punish the already deceased Amasis for his trickery, decided to commit what Herodotus calls an un-Persian act: he desecrated the tomb of the mummified Amasis and ordered the mummy burned.

However, Pierre Briant concludes that Herodotus' recorded information regarding Cambyses' actions in Egypt after the victory is false.

Cambyses then made peace with Libyans, accepting their offer for truce. Egypt became a possession of Persia, and Cambyses its Pharaoh. Because they defeated the pharaohs of the twenty-sixth dynasty, Persian monarchs were acknowledged as pharaohs and came to be known as Egypt's Twenty-seventh Dynasty (or the first Persian period).
