= Cassandane =

Wife of Cyrus the Great

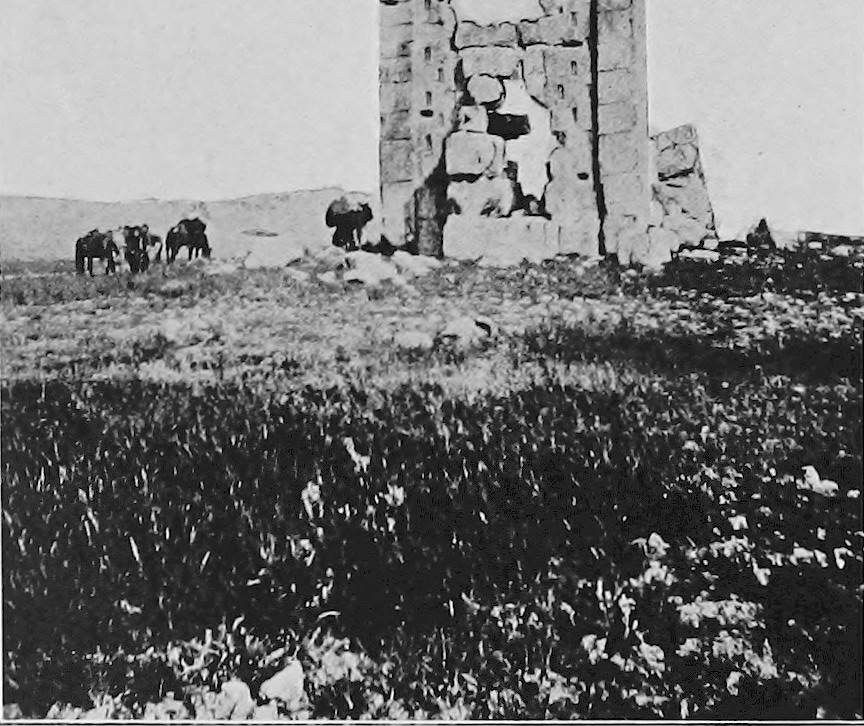
- An old image of a possible tomb of Cassandane in Pasargad Archaeological Site Suleiman Prison (Pasargad) 1906 image taken from the book Persia past and present by AV Williams Jackson (1906)

Queen consort of the Achaemenid Empire
- Tenure: 559–538 BC
- Coronation: 559 BC
- Successor: Atossa
- Died: 538 BC
- Burial: Pasargad
- Spouse: Cyrus the Great
- Issue: Cambyses II; Bardiya; Artystone; Atossa; Roxane
- House: Achaemenid
- Father: Pharnaspes

Cassandane or Cassandana (Ancient Greek: Κασσανδάνη, romanized: Kassandánē; died 538 BC) was an Achaemenian queen and the wife of king Cyrus the Great, the mother of Cambyses II and Atossa and the grandmother of Xerxes I.

She was a daughter of Pharnaspes. She had four children with Cyrus: Cambyses II, who succeeded his father and conquered Egypt; Smerdis (Bardiya), who also reigned as the king of Persia for a short time; a daughter named Atossa, who later wed Darius the Great; and another daughter named Roxana.

Her daughter Atossa later played an important role in the Achaemenid royal family, as she married Darius the Great and bore him the next Achaemenid king, Xerxes I.

When Cassandane died, all the nations of Cyrus' Persian empire observed "a great mourning". This is reported by Herodotus. According to the Nabonidus Chronicle, there was a public mourning after her death in Babylonia lasting for six days. Cassandane reportedly stated that it was more bitter to leave Cyrus's side than to die. The six days of mourning are identified as 21–26 March 538 BC. According to a suggestion by M. Boyce, Cassandane's tomb is located at Pasargadae.

== Notes ==
=== Bibliography ===
- Kuhrt, Amélie (2013). The Persian Empire: A Corpus of Sources from the Achaemenid Period. Routledge. ISBN 978-1-136-01694-3.
- Grayson (1975), Assyrian and Babylonian Chronicles
