= History of Persian Egypt =

The history of Persian Egypt refers to the two periods when ancient Egypt was controlled by the Achaemenid Empire:

- Twenty-seventh Dynasty of Egypt (525–404 BC), established by the first Achaemenid conquest of Egypt.
- Thirty-first Dynasty of Egypt (343–332 BC), established by the second Achaemenid conquest of Egypt.

These two periods of satrapies were punctuated by a brief interval of Egyptian independence from 404 BC to 343 BC.

== Background ==
In the 6th century BC, Persian kings, particularly Cyrus the Great, sought to expand their imperialist agenda to include Egypt. Expansionism was a key strategy for empires of the ancient Near East to establish military and economic dominance, and Egypt was one such priority for Cyrus, in large part due to the desirability of the Nile as an economic asset. The contemporaneous Egyptian pharaoh Amasis attempted to ward off the Persian invasion by forming alliances with neighbouring rulers, namely the Greek tyrant Polycrates of Samos, who also had a vested interest in preventing Persian expansionist campaigns from succeeding across the region. This strategy proved successful for a time, as Cyrus himself did not see Egypt conquered, though his son Cambyses II would achieve this feat during his own reign by 525 BC. Cambyses ousted the Egyptian pharaoh Psammetichus III and claimed the title for himself, bringing Egypt into the Persian realm as a prosperous resource. In 404 BC, the Egyptians detached from Persian administration under the pharaoh Amyrtaeus, who was the only ruler of the twenty-eighth dynasty. However, by 343 BC, Egypt was again conquered by the Persians under Artaxerxes III, but this re-assertion of authority lasted only for a decade, as the Achaemenid Empire itself fell to Alexander the Great.

== History ==
=== First Egyptian satrapy ===
==== Cambyses II ====
Cambyses II was given the regnal name of Mesuti-Ra, beginning the twenty-seventh dynasty of Egypt (and the first satrapy), which lasted from 525 to 404 BC. A regnal name for a pharaoh was a significant tradition for Egyptian royalty, as it highlighted the perception of the pharaoh as being a vessel for the gods, and therefore, a divine being in their own right. Though, following the conquest, Cambyses did try to maintain respect for Egyptian culture and traditions, sources suggest that he was unpopular, particularly amongst Egyptian priests, as the subsumption of Egypt into the Persian realm meant the effective erasure of Egyptian culture as the mainstream. This tension manifested itself by way of the introduction of Persian traditions and norms into Egyptian life and law. One of these norms was that Cambyses did not believe that citizens should be taxed to support the temples, as was Egyptian tradition, further alienating him from the support of the priesthood. Throughout Egyptian history, the temples, and by extension, the priests, were given immense support and a celebrated status. Therefore, by posing a threat to the economic support structure of the religious aspect of Egyptian life, Cambyses fundamentally altered a core aspect of Egyptian culture and life. Additionally, the conquered Egyptian people were considered secondary, which further disenchanted Cambyses to his newly conquered people. In 523 BC, Psammetichus III organized a revolt against the new Persian rule, demonstrating the displeasure amongst the Egyptian people at the commencement of the Achaemenid Empire. Supposedly, the revolt was overpowered by the Persian army and Cambyses consequently saw to the destruction of numerous significant temples as a form of punishment and a demonstration of power, though the veracity of this sequence of events is unconfirmed.

==== Darius I ====
Darius the Great ruled from the year 522 to 486 BC. The main legacy of this ruler can be seen in the building projects he commissioned (or, in some cases, the unfinished building projects that were completed under his leadership). In these architectural pursuits, Persian influence can be seen, for example, through the introduction of Persian water systems. The water systems were superior to those that were used in Egypt at the time, as the Persians were well known for their technological developments. Architecture is one of the most significant sources for providing understanding about ancient societies and their changing dynamics and periods, particularly those, like Egyptian society, for which there are minimal written sources to be studied. In this case, the archaeological evidence provides greater insight into the influence of Persian occupation on architecture. Additionally, the architectural evidence can also provide insight into attempts at the preservation of Egyptian culture, as these temples honoured Egyptian gods. Neither Darius, nor the other Persian pharaohs, desired to completely erase the culture of the nations they conquered. Darius’ rule also saw a number of revolts against Persian occupation, though none of these attempts at the re-establishment of sovereign Egyptian rule were successful.

==== Xerxes I ====
Xerxes I ruled from 486 to 465 BC. His reign was mainly characterised by his intent and attempt to expand Persian rule to include Greece—a venture in which, ultimately, he was unsuccessful. Xerxes’ reign ended when he and his eldest son were assassinated by members of the court.

==== Artaxerxes I ====
Artaxerxes was another of Xerxes’ sons whom the succession fell to after the deaths of his father and older brothers. Artaxerxes ruled, following the death of his father, from 465 to 424 BC. His reign saw the beginning of the decline of the twenty-seventh dynasty due to rising tensions and threats to total Persian control. The most significant such threat was the successful uprising orchestrated by the Egyptian rival ruler Inaros, who consequently took control of part of Egypt. However, Persian rule remained in place in Memphis, meaning that Egypt was temporarily divided. However, the Egyptians were ultimately defeated and full reign was restored to the Persian leadership.

==== Xerxes II ====
Artaxerxes I was followed by Xerxes II, who ruled for only one year between 424 and 423 BC. However, there is insufficient information on his reign as pharaoh, likely because it was too short for him to establish a significant legacy or enact meaningful change.

==== Darius II ====
Darius II ruled from 423 to 404 BC and was the last pharaoh of the twenty-seventh dynasty. His reign included him initiating conflict with Athens and subsequently entering into an alliance with Sparta to support them in the war. This endeavour led to the Persian conquest of part of Ionia. Darius II's reign in Egypt ended when a rebellion led by the native Egyptian Amyrtaeus expelled him from Egypt and reinstated Egyptian rule. Though his successor Artaxerxes II did make attempts to restore Persian rule, he faced numerous rebellions and uprisings and in the end, he was unsuccessful. Thus, there is debate over which pharaoh, Darius II or Artaxerxes II, was the final ruler of the first period of Persian Egyptian rule. However, it was the ending of the reigns of those two rulers that marked the end of the first period of Persian Egypt.

=== Second Egyptian satrapy ===
Persian rule of Egypt was re-established within a century, beginning the Second Egyptian Satrapy. The second period of Persian occupation, between 340/39 and 330 BC, was, overall, a shorter and more tumultuous period in which Persian dominance in Egypt was far from certain. Its end came about with Alexander the Great’s conquering of the Persian Empire, though the strength of the Persian rulers during this time in Egypt was fairly weak regardless, having only just re-established rule and facing consistent difficulties of succession conflicts and disloyalty within the court.

==== Artaxerxes III ====
The first pharaoh of this second period of Persian rule of Egypt was Artaxerxes III, who ruled from 358 to 338 BC. Artaxerxes III subjugated Egypt during his reign as Persian ruler, going to war with the Egyptian Pharaoh Nectanebo II, and in doing so caused significant destruction in Egypt. Artaxerxes III's reign also saw a lot of building activity as well as military success. Military and architectural achievements were the two main contributing factors to the legacies of Egyptian rulers, as they were both, in their own ways, considered demonstrations of the strength and prosperity of the dynasty. In 338 BC, Artaxerxes died, ending his reign, however, the circumstances surrounding his death remain unclear, with some sources citing it as natural causes and others detailing an assassination plot by a military official, Bagoas, who then elevated Artaxerxes’ youngest son, Arses, to the throne.

==== Artaxerxes IV ====
Arses ruled for only 3 years, from 338 to 336 BC. The circumstances of his death, once again, are not entirely clear, though the same aforementioned sources that suggest Bagoas killed Artaxerxes III say that Arses was also assassinated by him.

==== Darius III ====
Finally, Arses was succeeded by Darius III, a second cousin of Arses, who ruled from 336 to 330 BC. The succession difficulties that marked this period of Persian rule of Egypt ultimately weakened the Empire, and potentially contributed to the failure of the rulers to prevent external forces from imposing upon them. During Darius III's reign, Alexander the Great led the Macedonian army to victory in conquering the Persian Empire, as such, this ended Darius III's reign. Given that the Persian empire had been officially conquered, there was no Persian leader to become Darius III's successor, and thus ended the Achaemenid period of Egypt.

== See also ==
- Persian conquest of Egypt
  - Sasanian conquest of Egypt
