= Thirty-first Dynasty of Egypt =

343–332 BC Achaemenid province (satrapy)

Thirty-first Dynasty of Egypt (Achaemenid Egypt)
- Satrapy of the Achaemenid Empire
- 343 BC–332 BC
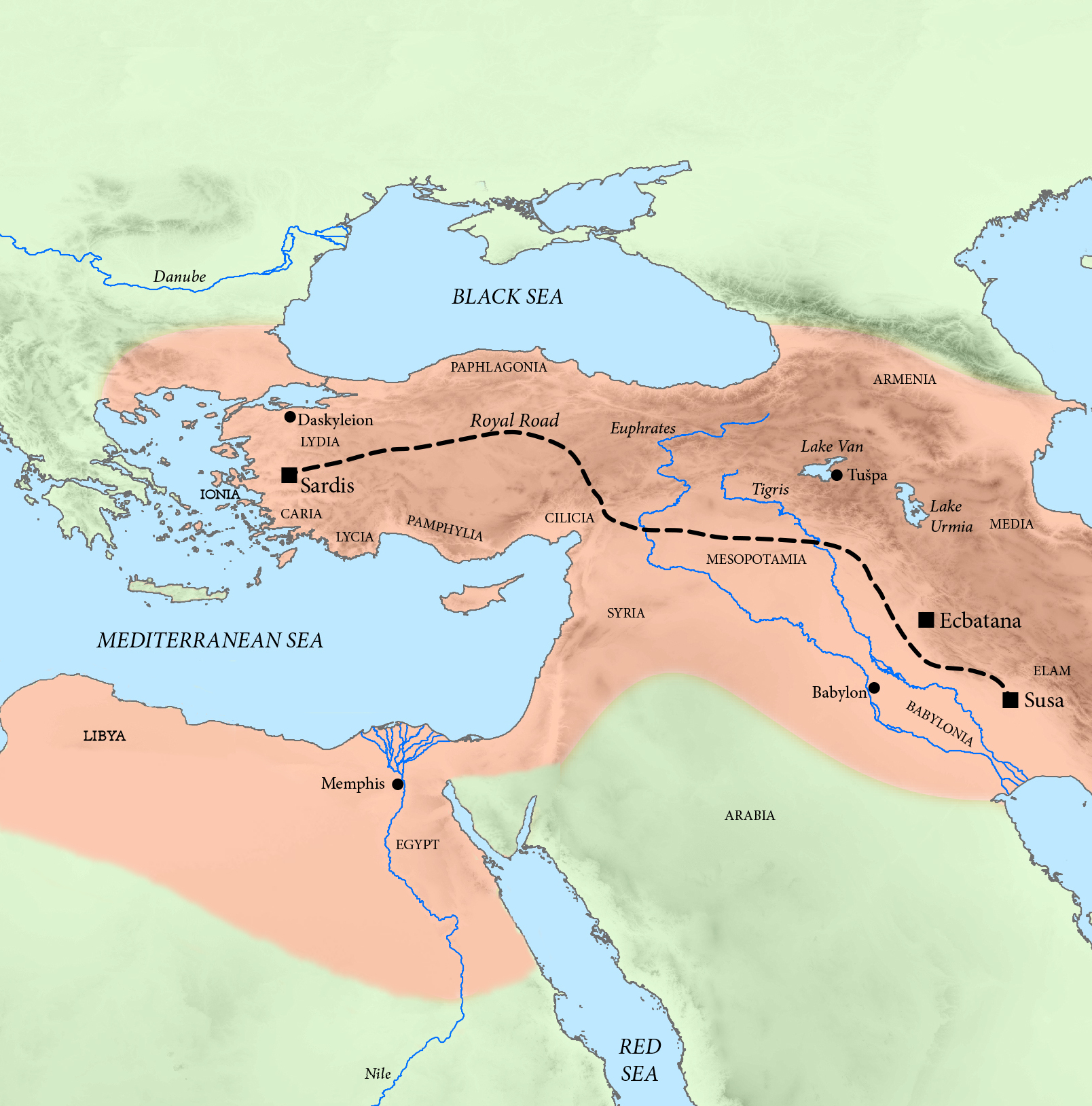
- Western part of the Achaemenid Empire, with the territories of Egypt.
- Government
- Pharaoh
  - 343–338 BC: Artaxerxes III (first)
  - 336–332 BC: Darius III (last)
- Historical era: Achaemenid era
  - Conquests of Artaxerxes III: 343 BC
  - Conquests of Alexander the Great: 332 BC
Preceded by	Succeeded by
Thirtieth dynasty of Egypt	Macedonian Empire; Ptolemaic Kingdom

The Thirty-first Dynasty of Egypt (notated Dynasty XXXI, alternatively 31st Dynasty or Dynasty 31), also known as the Second Egyptian Satrapy, was effectively a satrapy of the Achaemenid Empire between 343 BC to 332 BC. It was founded by Artaxerxes III, the King of Persia, after his reconquest of Egypt and subsequent crowning as Pharaoh of Egypt, and was disestablished upon the conquest of Egypt by Alexander the Great.

The period of the 31st Dynasty was the second occasion in which Persian pharaohs ruled Egypt, hence the term "Second Egyptian Satrapy". Before the 31st Dynasty was founded, Egypt had enjoyed a brief period of independence, during which three indigenous dynasties reigned (the 28th, 29th, and 30th dynasties). The period before this is referred to as the "First Egyptian Satrapy" or the 27th Dynasty (525–404 BC).

== History ==
=== First Egyptian Campaign ===
In around 351 BC, Artaxerxes embarked on a campaign to recover Egypt, which had revolted under his father, Artaxerxes II. At the same time, a rebellion had broken out in Asia Minor, which, being supported by Thebes, threatened to become serious. Levying a vast army, Artaxerxes marched into Egypt, and engaged Nectanebo II. After a year of fighting the Egyptian Pharaoh, Nectanebo inflicted a crushing defeat on the Persians with the support of mercenaries led by the Greek generals Diophantus and Lamius. Artaxerxes was compelled to retreat and to postpone his plans to reconquer Egypt.

=== Second Egyptian Campaign ===
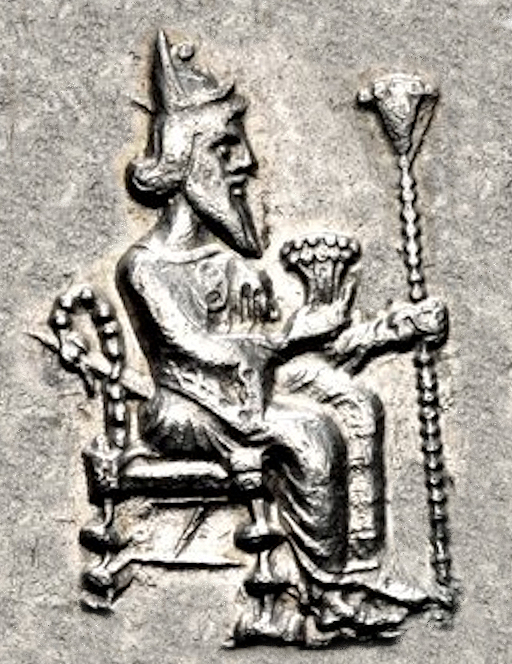
Artaxerxes III as Pharaoh, satrapal coinage of Cilicia.

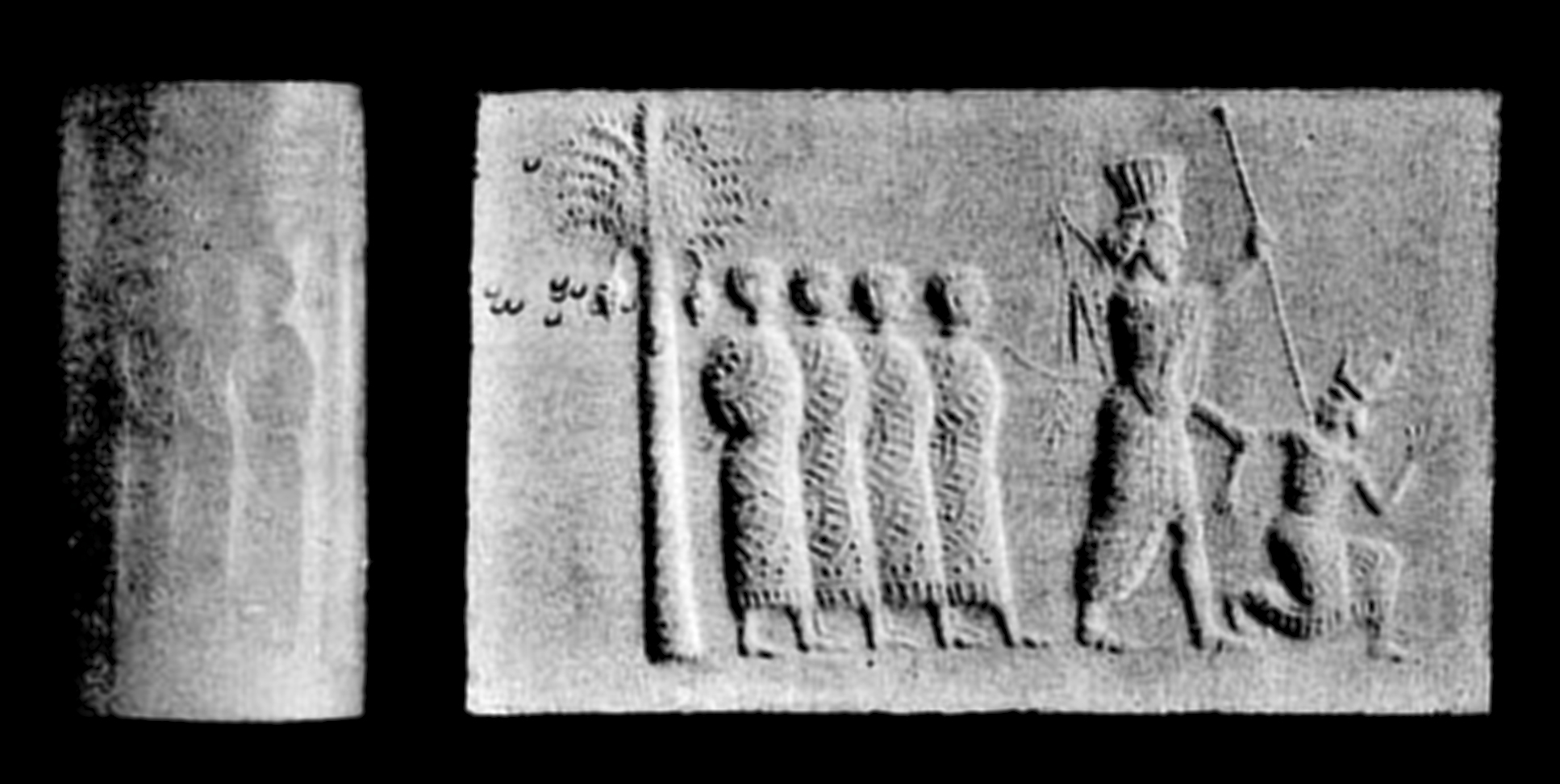
The Svenigorodsky cylinder seal depicting a Persian king thrusting his lance at an Egyptian pharaoh, while holding four other Egyptian captives on a rope.

In 343 BC, Artaxerxes, in addition to his 330,000 Persians, had now a force of 8,000 Greeks furnished by the Greek cities of Asia Minor: 4,000 under Mentor, consisting of the troops which he had brought to the aid of Tennes from Egypt; 3,000 sent by Argos; and 1000 from Thebes. He divided these troops into three bodies, and placed at the head of each a Persian and a Greek. The Greek commanders were Lacrates of Thebes, Mentor of Rhodes and Nicostratus of Argos while the Persians were led by Rhossaces, Aristazanes, and Bagoas, the chief of the eunuchs. Nectanebo II resisted with an army of 100,000 of whom 20,000 were Greek mercenaries. Nectanebo II occupied the Nile and its various branches with his large navy. The character of the country, intersected by numerous canals, and full of strongly fortified towns, was in his favour and Nectanebo II might have been expected to offer a prolonged, if not even a successful, resistance. But he lacked good generals, and over-confident in his own powers of command, he found himself out-manoeuvered and defeated by the combined Persian armies near Pelusium.

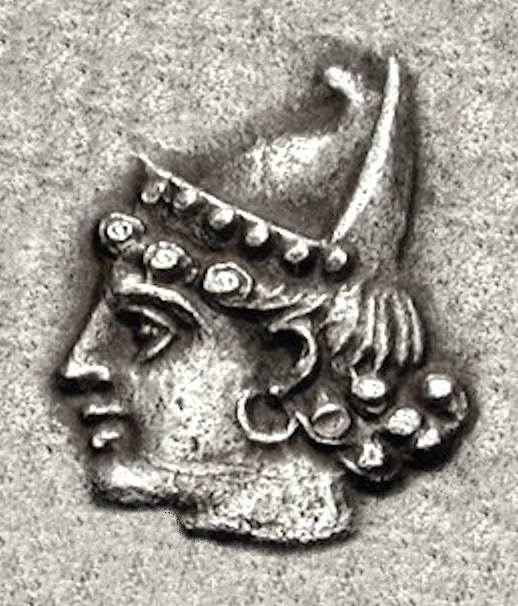
Probable portrait of young Artaxerxes IV as Pharaoh, wearing the Pharaonic crown.

After his defeat, Nectanebo hastily fled to Memphis, leaving the fortified towns to be defended by their garrisons. These garrisons consisted of partly Greek and partly Egyptian troops, between whom jealousies and suspicions were easily sown by the Persian leaders. As a result, the Persians were able to rapidly defeat numerous towns across Lower Egypt and were advancing upon Memphis when Nectanebo decided to quit the country and flee southwards to Ethiopia. The Persian army then completely routed the Egyptians and occupied the Lower Delta of the Nile. Following Nectanebo's flight to Ethiopia, all of Egypt submitted to Artaxerxes. The Jews in Egypt were sent either to Babylon or to the south coast of the Caspian Sea, the same location where the Jews of Phoenicia had earlier been sent.

After this victory over the Egyptians, Artaxerxes had the city walls destroyed, started a reign of terror, and set about looting all the temples. Persia gained a significant amount of wealth from this looting. Artaxerxes also imposed high taxes and attempted to weaken Egypt enough that it could never revolt against Persia again. During the 10 years that Persia controlled Egypt, believers in the native religion were persecuted and sacred books were stolen. Before he returned to Persia, he appointed Pherendares as satrap of Egypt. With the wealth gained from his reconquest of Egypt, Artaxerxes was able to amply reward his mercenaries. He then returned to his capital, having successfully completed his invasion and occupation of Egypt.

=== Satrapal rule in Egypt ===
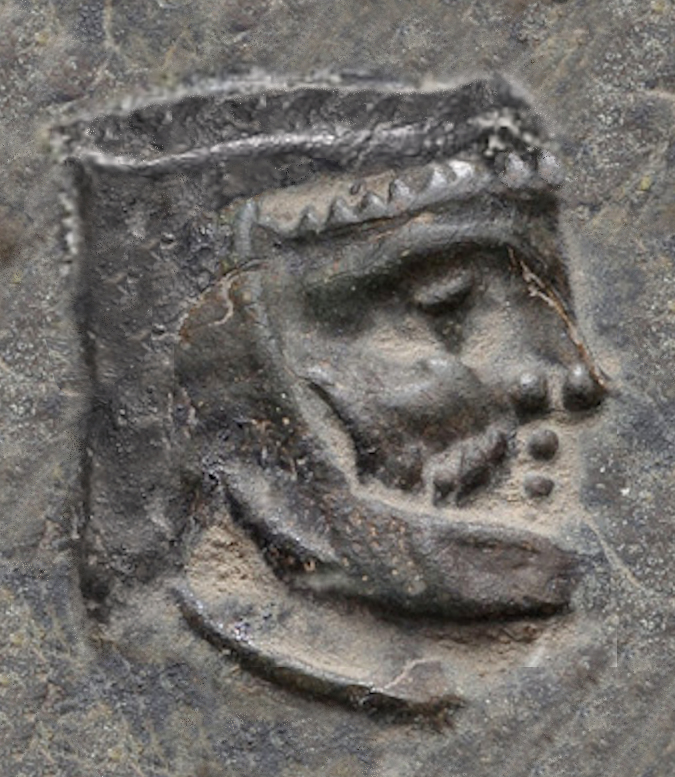
Portrait of Sabaces, Achaemenid satrap of Egypt, from his coinage. Circa 340-333 BC. Achaemenid Egypt.

It is not known who served as satrap after Artaxerxes III, but Pherendates II was an early satrap of Egypt. Under Darius III (336–330 BC) there was Sabaces, who fought and died at Issus and was succeeded by Mazaces. Egyptians also fought at Issus, for example, the nobleman Somtutefnekhet of Heracleopolis, who described on the "Naples stele" how he escaped during the battle against the Greeks and how Arsaphes, the god of his city, protected him and allowed him to return home.

In 332 BC, Mazaces handed over the country to Alexander the Great without a fight. The Achaemenid empire had ended, and for a while Egypt was a satrapy in Alexander's empire. Cleomenes of Naucratis oversaw the transfer of Egypt's tax revenue to other provinces, possibly under the title of satrap. At Alexander's death, Ptolemy was formally appointed satrap prior to his establishment of the Ptolemaic Kingdom. The Romans eventually replaced the Ptolemaic dynasty, maintaining Egypt as the personal property of Augustus and the subsequent emperors and ruling through local governors.

== Culture ==
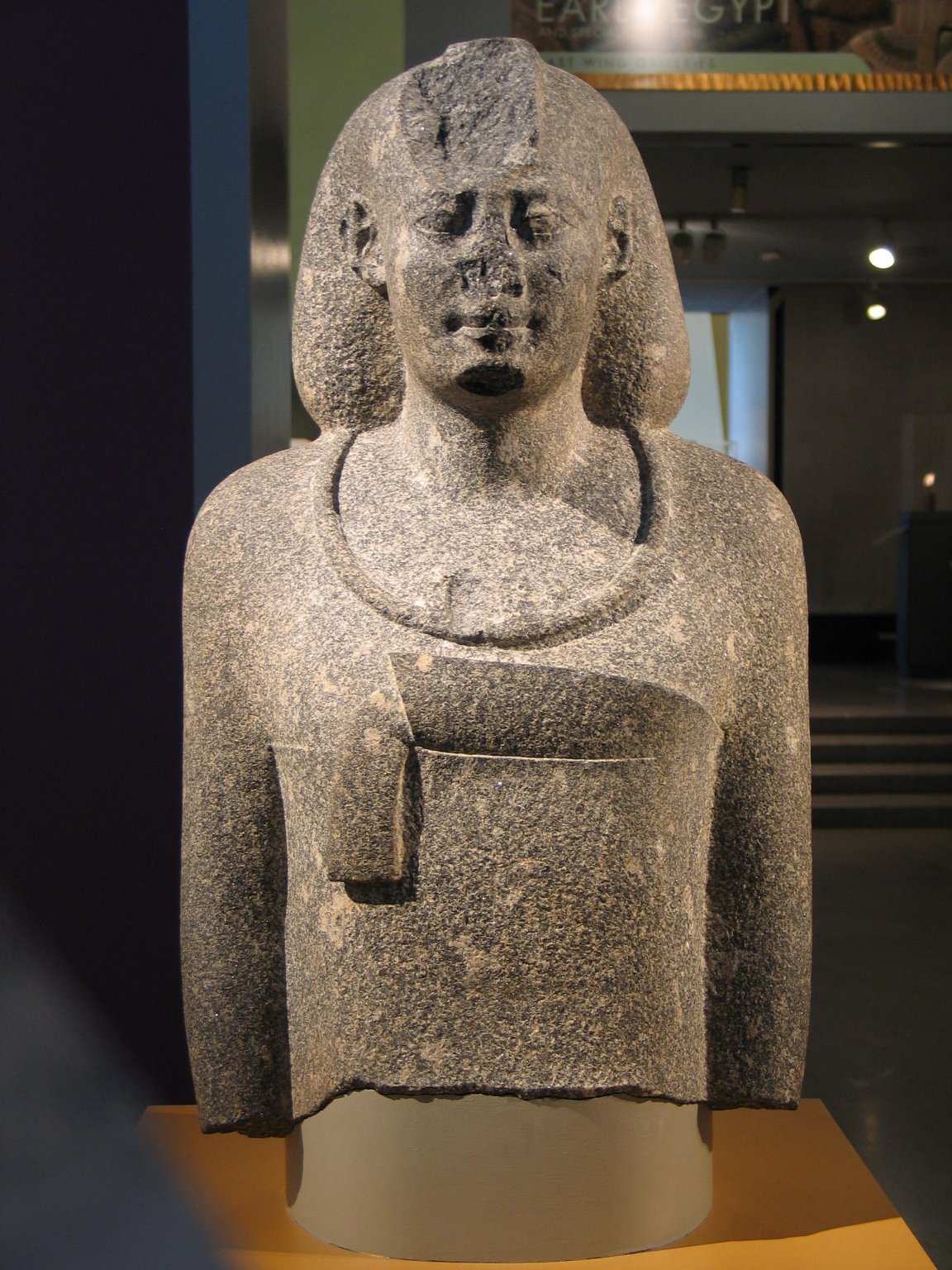
Egyptian man in a Persian costume, c. 343–332 BC, accession number 71.139, Brooklyn Museum.

Occasionally Egyptians wore foreign costumes and jewelry. The taste for non-Egyptian fashion arose during periods of extensive trade or diplomatic contact with distant courts, or when Egypt was controlled by a foreign power. The Persians, who thrice invaded the Nile Valley from their West Asia homeland, dominated Egypt from 525–404 BCE (27th Dynasty), 342–332 BCE (31st Dynasty), and 619–628 CE (Sasanian Egypt). This statue dates to the later period of Persian rule in Egypt.

According to the Brooklyn Museum, "The long skirt shown wrapped around this statue’s body and tucked in at the upper edge of the garment is typically Persian. The necklace, called a torque, is decorated with images of ibexes, symbols in ancient Persia of agility and sexual prowess. The depiction of this official in Persian dress may have been a demonstration of loyalty to the new rulers."

== Coinage ==
=== Achaemenid Egyptian coinage ===
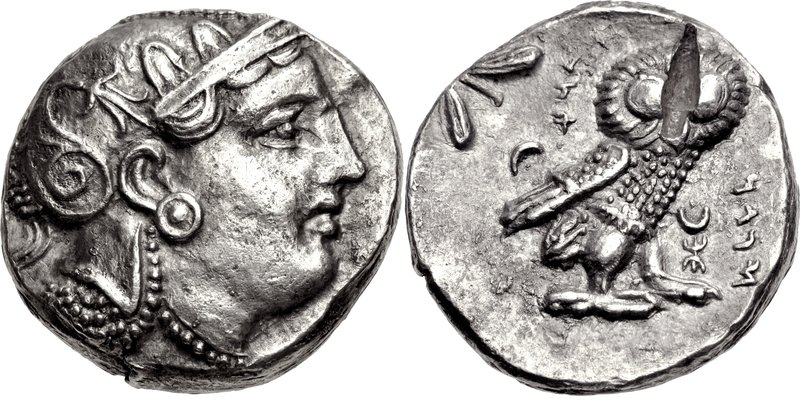
Coin of Satrap Sabakes, in imitation of Athenian coinage. Circa 340-333 BC. Achaemenid Egypt.

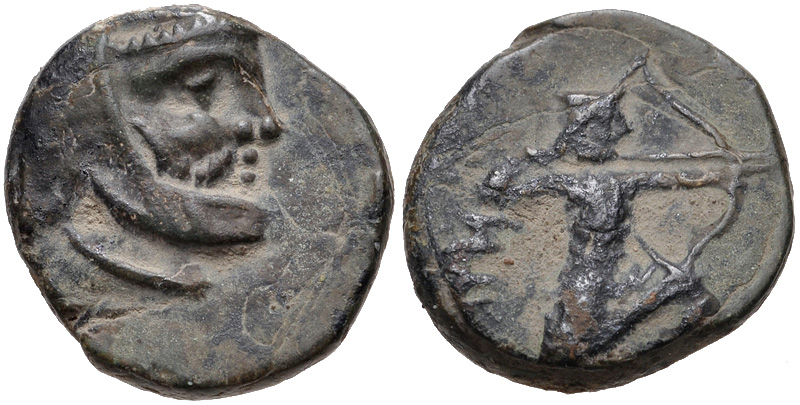
Coin of Satrap Sabakes. Achaemenid Egypt. Circa 335-333 BC

=== Cilician coinage with Achaemenid rulers as Pharaohs ===
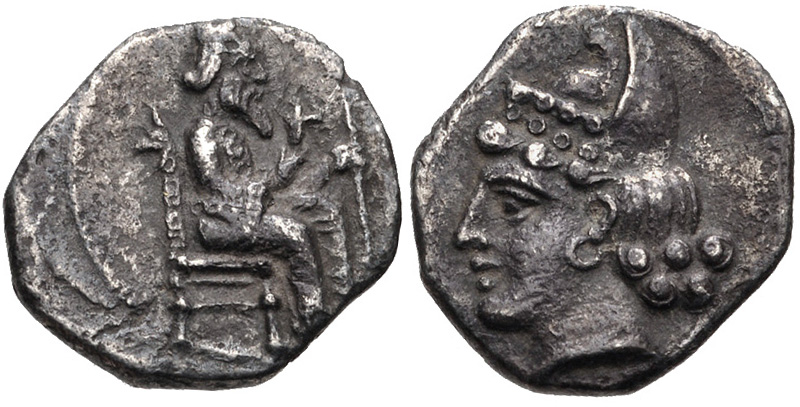
Another similar coin. Mazaios, Satrap of Cilicia, 361/0-334 BC.

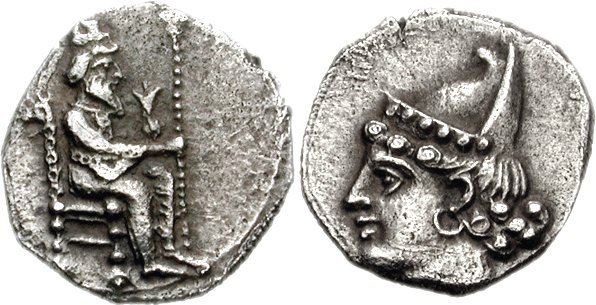
Another similar coin. Mazaios, Satrap of Cilicia, 361/0-334 BC.

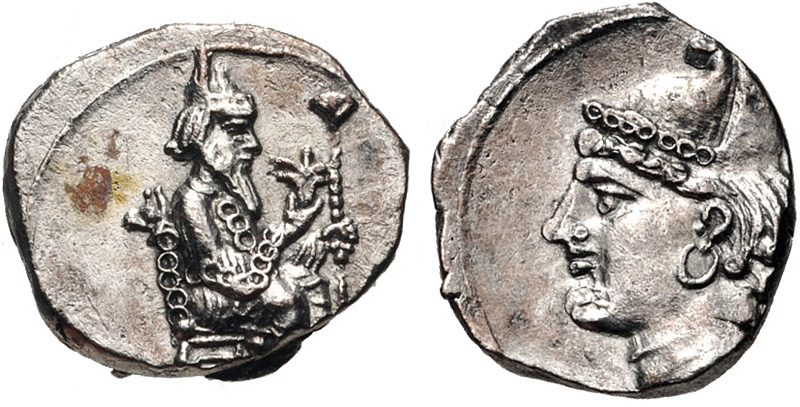
Coin of Cilicia 343-332 BC, thought to represent Artaxerxes III on the obverse, and a young Artaxerxes IV on the reverse, both wearing the Pharaonic crown.

== Pharaohs of the 31st Dynasty ==
Name of Pharaoh	Image	Reign	Throne Name	Comments
Artaxerxes III		343–338 BC		Placed Egypt under Persian rule for a second time
Artaxerxes IV		338–336 BC		Only reigned in Lower Egypt
Khababash		338–335 BC	Senen-setepu-ni-ptah	Led a revolt against Persian rule in Upper Egypt, declared himself Pharaoh
Darius III		336–332 BC		Upper Egypt returned to Persian control in 335 BC

== Satraps of the 31st Dynasty ==
Name of satrap	Rule	Reigning monarch	Comments
Pherendates II	343–335 BC	Artaxerxes III	
Sabaces	335-333 BC	Darius III	Killed in the battle of Issus
Mazaces	333–332 BC	Darius III	

== See also ==
- Twenty-seventh Dynasty of Egypt (525 BC−404 BC), also known as the First Egyptian Satrapy.
- Sasanian Egypt

== Sources ==
- Fragments of Ctesias (Persica)
- Diodorus Siculus (Bibliotheca historica)
- Fragments of Manetho (Aegyptiaca)
- Flavius Josephus (Antiquities of the Jews)

Preceded by Thirtieth Dynasty	Dynasties of Egypt c. 343 BC–332 BC	Succeeded by Macedonian Empire
