= Persian conquest of Egypt =

"Persian conquest of Egypt" may refer to:

- First Achaemenid conquest of Egypt (525 BC)
- Second Achaemenid conquest of Egypt (340/339 BC)
- Sasanian conquest of Egypt (AD 618–621)

== See also ==
- History of Persian Egypt
