= Belesys =

Belesys may refer to:

- Belesys I (r. 407 – 401 BCE), satrap of Eber-Nari, known in Babylonian as Bēlšunu
  - Bēl-uṣuršu, father of Belesys I, also identified as Belesys by some sources
- Belesys II (r. 358 – 338 BCE), satrap of Eber-Nari
- Nabopolassar, first king of the Neo-Babylonian Empire, called Belesys or Bupolasaros by Hellenistic-era authors
