= Achaemenid conquest of Egypt =

Achaemenid conquest of Egypt may refer to:

- First Achaemenid conquest of Egypt (525 BC)
- Second Achaemenid conquest of Egypt (340/339 BC)

== See also ==
- Conquest of Egypt
