= Conquest of Egypt =

Conquest of Egypt may refer to:

- Arab conquest of Egypt
- First Achaemenid conquest of Egypt
- Second Achaemenid conquest of Egypt
- Assyrian conquest of Egypt
- Fatimid conquest of Egypt
- Roman conquest of Egypt
- Sasanian conquest of Egypt
