= Pherendates II =

Achaemenid satrap of Egypt

- Satrap of Egypt
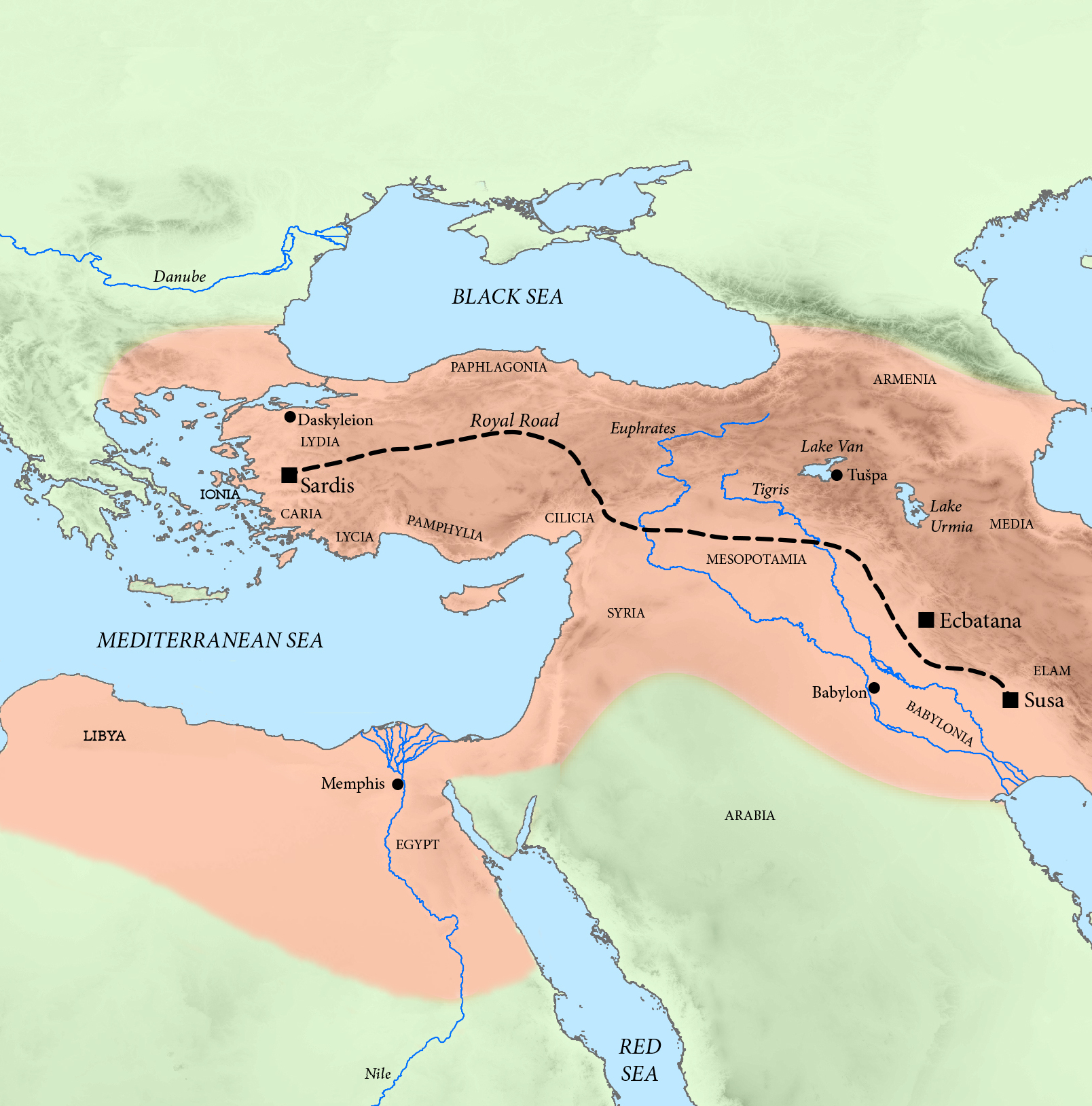
- Pherendates II was satrap of the restored Achaemenid Province of Egypt.
- Predecessor: office restored
- Successor: Sabaces
- Dynasty: 31st Dynasty
- Pharaoh: Artaxerxes III

Pherendates II (from the Old Persian Farnadāta) was an Achaemenid satrap of ancient Egypt during the 4th century BCE, at the time of the 31st Dynasty of Egypt.

Almost nothing is known about him. In his Bibliotheca historica, Diodorus Siculus reports that, after the Achaemenid conquest of Egypt, Artaxerxes III appointed Pherendates II as satrap. His office must have been very brief, since his successor Sabaces was killed in the battle of Issus (333 BCE) while serving Darius III.

Preceded by office restored	Satrap of Egypt c.343 – 335 BCE	Succeeded by Sabaces
