= Satrapy of Egypt =

Satrapy of Egypt may refer to:

- 27th Dynasty of Egypt, the First Egyptian Satrapy of Achaemenid Persia
- 31st Dynasty of Egypt, the Second Egyptian Satrapy of Achaemenid Persia
