= Shahralanyozan =

Sasanian military governor of Egypt

- Shahrālānyōzān
- Born: Unknown
- Spouse: "Endoxotatē kyría"
- Military career
- Allegiance: Sasanian Empire
- Branch: Sasanian army
- Rank: karframan-idar ("steward of the court")
- Commands: Sasanian Egypt

Shahralanyozan (Middle Persian: 𐭱𐭲𐭥𐭠𐭫𐭠𐭭𐭩𐭥𐭰𐭠𐭭, romanized: Šahr-Ālānyōzān) was an Iranian officer who served as the military governor of Sasanian Egypt during the 620s.

== Name ==
The Middle Persian word Šahr-Ālānyōzān is actually an honorific title which, according to Saeid Jalalipour, means "the one who combats the Alans". According to Ilya Gershevitch, the title means "most powerful of commanders".

The name is recorded in Greek sources as Saralaneozan (Σαραλανεοζαν) and Sahralanyozan.

== Biography ==
Shahralanyozan is first mentioned in 621 as being appointed the military governor of Egypt after the conquest of the province by the Sasanian general Shahrbaraz. Shahralanyozan held the title of karframan-idar ("steward of the court") and was the most powerful Iranian in Egypt. Besides being governor of Egypt, he was also the tax-collector of the province, and most likely resided in Faiyum. Although Egypt suffered much damage during its invasion by the Sasanians, after the conquest was complete, peace, toleration and rehabilitation followed. Furthermore, the Sasanians retained the same administrative structure as the Byzantine Empire.

In 626, Shahrbaraz quarrelled with the Sasanian king Khosrow II (r. 590-628) and mutinied against him. It is not known whom Shahralanyozan supported, since he is not mentioned in any source thereafter and Shahrbaraz is described as the ruler of the province. Following the end of the Byzantine–Sasanian war in 628, by 630/1, Egypt had returned to Byzantine hands.

== Sources ==
- Jalalipour, Saeid (2014). Persian Occupation of Egypt 619-629: Politics and Administration of Sasanians (PDF). Sasanika.
- Howard-Johnston, James (2006). East Rome, Sasanian Persia And the End of Antiquity: Historiographical And Historical Studies. Ashgate Publishing. ISBN 0-86078-992-6.
- Altheim-Stiehl, Ruth (1998). "EGYPT iv. Relations in the Sasanian period". Encyclopaedia Iranica, Vol. VIII, Fasc. 3. pp. 252–254.
