= Belesys II =

Belesys II was the ruler of Achaemenid Syria as the satrap of Eber-Nari from 358–338 BCE.

Belesys II was involved in suppressing the rebellion of Sidon in 351 BCE. After the defeat of Artaxerxes III in his Egyptian campaign, Phoenicia declared independence from Persian rule. Artaxerxes initiated a counter-offensive against Sidon by commanding the satrap of Syria Belesys II and Mazaeus, the satrap of Cilicia, to invade the city and to keep the Phoenicians in check. Both satraps suffered crushing defeats at the hands of Tennes, the Sidonese king, who was aided by 40,000 Greek mercenaries sent to him by Nectanebo II and commanded by Mentor of Rhodes. As a result, the Persian forces were driven out of Phoenicia.

An earlier Belesys I is also known, whose palace was destroyed by Cyrus the Younger in 401 BCE, and had first been a Governor of Babylon and then a satrap of Syria.
