= Bisthanes =

4th century BCE Achaemenid man

Bisthanes (Ancient Greek: Βισθάνης) was the son of Artaxerxes III, King of Kings of the Achaemenid Empire, and later became the brother-in-law of Alexander the Great. His mother is unknown, but was perhaps one of Artaxerxes's concubines. He lived in the late 4th century BCE.

== Succession crisis ==
In 338 BCE, Artaxerxes's vizier, the eunuch and chiliarch Bagoas, poisoned the king, triggering a crisis in Persia in which Bagoas murdered most of Artaxerxes's other sons, except for Bisthanes and his half-brother, the young Arses of Persia, the latter of whom Bagoas put on the throne in hopes of controlling him. Bagoas later also murdered Arses, in 336 BCE, and put on the throne their obscure, distant cousin Darius III.

Bisthanes also had a sister, Parysatis II, who was the wife of Alexander the Great. After Alexander defeated Darius at the Battle of Gaugamela, Darius fled to Ecbatana, whither Alexander pursued him. When Alexander arrived there, Bisthanes met him, in 330 BCE, to inform him that Darius had already fled the city.

Whether he had always been with Alexander since Gaugamela, or was in Ecbatana at the time as a member of Darius's retinue, and was therefore surrendering to Alexander in this moment, is unclear. Some scholars assume he remained in Alexander's entourage from this point forward.

== Daughter ==
The 1st-century-CE historian Quintus Curtius Rufus wrote an anecdote in which Alexander discovers an unnamed highborn woman among his captives, claiming to be the wife of Hystaspes (an otherwise obscure and unknown relative of Darius), and the granddaughter of Artaxerxes by one of his sons. Historian Helmut Berve has suggested that she was the daughter of Bisthanes. Other notable historians of Alexander, such as Waldemar Heckel, disagree, with Heckel going so far as to say that Berve makes her a daughter of Bisthanes "for no good reason".

== Historical contradiction ==
In the account of the 1st-century-CE historian Diodorus Siculus, he writes that all of the sons of Artaxerxes except Arses were murdered by Bagoas around the time Artaxerxes was murdered in 338 BCE. While he does not mention Bisthanes by name, he does go so far as to say that when Bagoas murders Arses, the house of Artaxerxes is then made extinct.

This creates some conflict with the account of 2nd-century-CE historian Arrian, who is the only writer who mentions Bisthanes, but whose Anabasis of Alexander is generally considered the superior -- though not unimpeachable -- source on Alexander's campaigns. Arrian describes Bisthanes as a "predecessor of Darius", and meeting Alexander in 330 BCE, long after Diodorus describes the line of Artaxerxes as having been extinguished.

Scholars such as Theodor Nöldeke have suggested Diodorus was simply mistaken about how exhaustive was Bagoas's purge of the family. Others have suggested that Arrian was perhaps mistaken about the relationship of Bisthanes to the house of Artaxerxes.
