= Arabian Nome =

Province in Ancient Egypt

The Arabia Nome was a province in Ancient Egypt (nome being the Greek term for a district). It was located in northern Egypt, approximately from the eastern bank of the Nile Delta to the Suez Canal region, and its capital was Phacusa on the site of what is today known as the city of Faqous in the Sharqiyah governate.

It enters the historical record in the mid 4th century BCE after Alexander the Great's invasion of Egypt, when he appoints Cleomenes of Naucratis as governor of the district and as tax collector for all the provinces of Egypt. Frequently, the governors of this district were referred to as an Arabarch (king of the Arabs).

The name is presumed to have been derived from the large presence of Arabs living in the region. However, Arabs are noted to have been living throughout Egypt, in all the major desert oases in the country. They were especially populous in the Eastern Desert along the Red Sea coast, in the Faiyum region (Arsinoite Nome) where a city Ptolemais Arabon (Ptolemais of Arabs) was named after them, and in the city of Coptos.

In the Egyptian lists it is recorded as the 20th district of Lower Egypt, although the eastern deserts were also referred to at the time as Arabia, as "locations east of the Nile were indicated as being “of Arabia of such-and-such nome.”"

During the Roman period, this region was renamed Aegyptus Herculia, and later in the late Byzantine period renamed again to Augustamnica.
