= Mazaces =

Last Achaemenid satrap of Egypt from 333 to 332 BCE

- Satrap of Egypt; Satrap of Mesopotamia
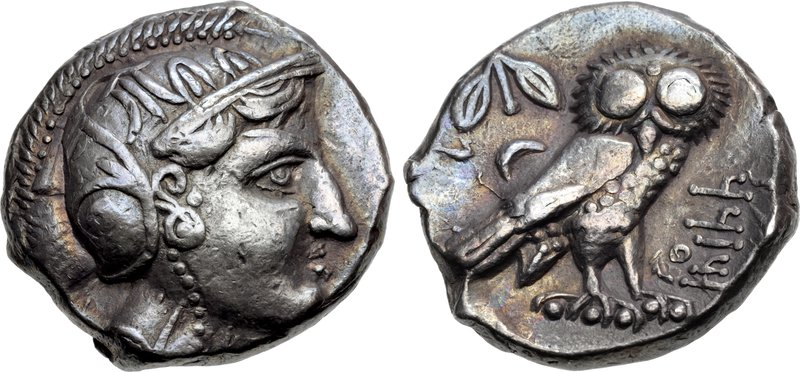
- Coin of Mazakes as Satrap of Mesopotamia in the Alexandrine Empire. 331-323-2 BC. Obverse: Athena. Reverse: Athenian owl, MZDK (𐡌𐡆𐡃𐡊 in Aramaic).
- Predecessor: Sabaces
- Successor: Cleomenes of Naucratis
- Dynasty: 31st Dynasty
- Pharaoh: Darius III

Mazaces, also Mazakes (Old Iranian: Mazdāka, Aramaic: 𐡌𐡆𐡃𐡊 MZDK), was the last Achaemenid satrap of ancient Egypt during the late reign of Darius III of the 31st Dynasty of Egypt.

Mazaces succeeded Sabaces after the latter's death at the battle of Issus (333 BCE). His office lasted less than a year: when Alexander the Great invaded Egypt in late 332 BCE, Mazaces did not have enough military force to put up a resistance. Counselled by Amminapes, who knew Alexander well, Mazaces handed the country to the Macedonian without a fight, along with a treasure of 800 talents of gold. This event marked the end of the short–lived second Egyptian satrapy (343–332 BCE).

It is unknown what happened to Mazaces after this event, but Alexander assigned the role of satrap of Egypt to the Greek Cleomenes of Naucratis before leaving for the East.

Mazakes may have been nominated as satrap of Mesopotamia in reward for his submission, as coins in his name and in a style similar to his Egyptian predecessor Sabakes, are found in this region, and the satrap of Mesopotamia at that time is otherwise unknown.

The next satrap of Mesopotamia was Bleitor.

| Preceded by Sabaces | Satrap of Egypt; 333 – 332 BCE | Succeeded by Cleomenes of Naucratis |
