= Sabaces =

Persian general

- Satrap of Egypt
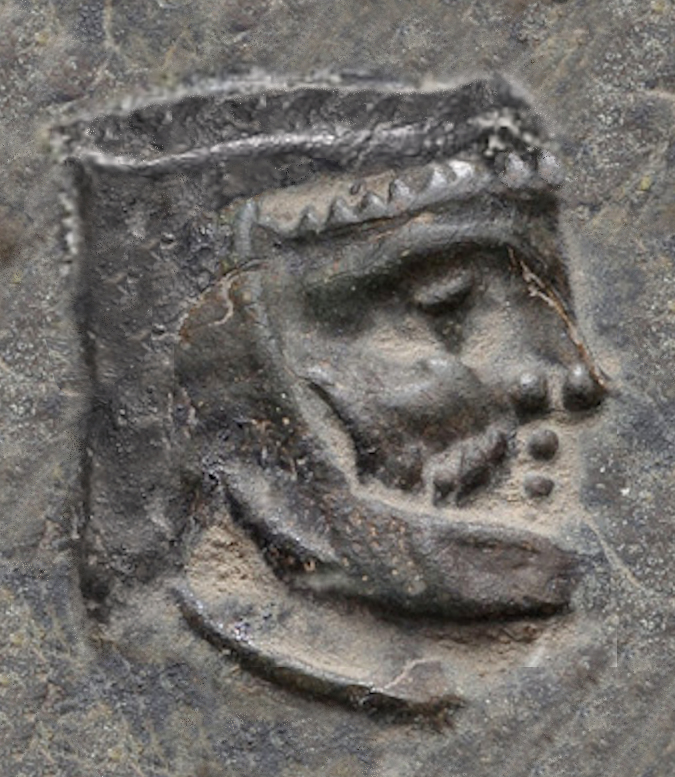
- Portrait of satrap Sabaces from his coinage. Circa 340-333 BC. Achaemenid Egypt.
- Predecessor: Pherendates II
- Successor: Mazaces
- Dynasty: 31st Dynasty
- Pharaoh: Darius III

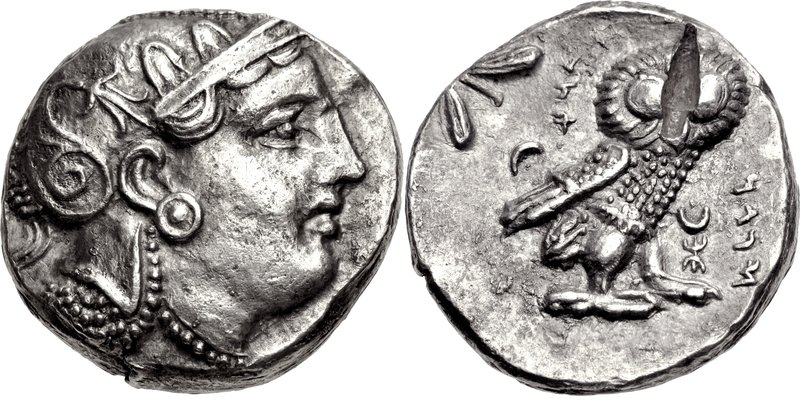
Coin of Sabaces, in imitation of Athenian coinage. Obverse: Head of Athena. Reverse: Athenian owl. To right: Sabaces symbol and Aramaic inscription 𐡎𐡅𐡉𐡊 SWYK. Circa 340-333 BC. Achaemenid Egypt.

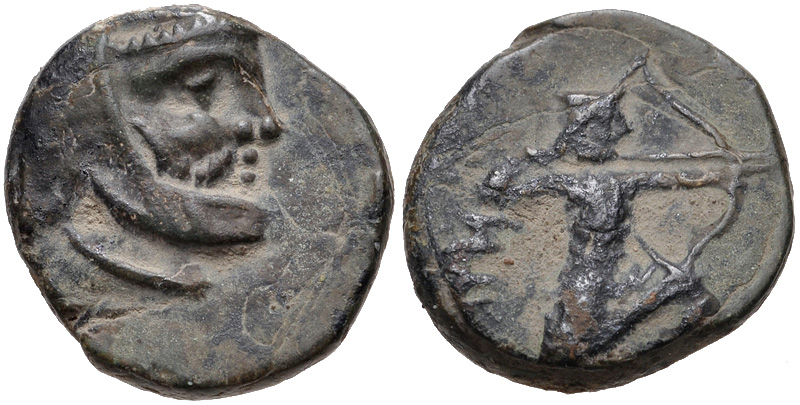
Coin of Sabaces. Persian Egypt. Circa 335-333 BC

Sabaces (Ancient Greek: Σαβάκης; name variants: Sabakes, Sauaces; Sataces; Sathaces; Diodorus Siculus calls him Tasiaces (Τασιάκης); Aramaic: 𐡎𐡅𐡉𐡊 SWYK, died in 333 BC) was an Achaemenid Persian satrap of the Achaemenid Thirty-first Dynasty of Egypt during the reign of king Darius III of Persia.

== Resistance to Alexander the Great ==
Some time before the Battle of Issus (modern-day Turkey), Sabaces left Egypt with his army to join Darius III in Syria and support him in his fight against Alexander the Great. When the Battle of Issus took place (November 333 BC) Alexander and his horsemen fought their way through the enemy troops until they came in close vicinity to Darius III, whose life was therefore threatened. Darius III was protected by the most noble Persians, among them also Sabaces, who was killed:

Of the Persians were killed Arsames, Rheomithres, and Atizyes who had commanded the cavalry at the Granicus. Sabaces, viceroy of Egypt, and Bubaces, one of the Persian dignitaries, were also killed, besides about 100,000 of the private soldiers, among them being more than 10,000 cavalry.

— The Anabasis of Alexander by Arrian, translated by E. J. Chinnock, Book II, Chapter XI

The Persian king fled because he feared for his life; therefore the Macedonians won the battle.

== Successor ==
Mazaces was probably the successor of Sabaces in Egypt, but because Sabaces had taken with him nearly all occupying forces, Mazaces was not able to organize military resistance against the Macedonians. Therefore, Alexander the Great was able to take Egypt without fighting (332 BC).

== Notes ==
Preceded by Pherendates II	Satrap of Egypt; 335 – 333 BCE	Succeeded by Mazaces
