= Artaxerxes III =

King of the Achaemenid Empire from 359/8 to 338 BC

Artaxerxes III; 𐎠𐎼𐎫𐎧𐏁𐏂
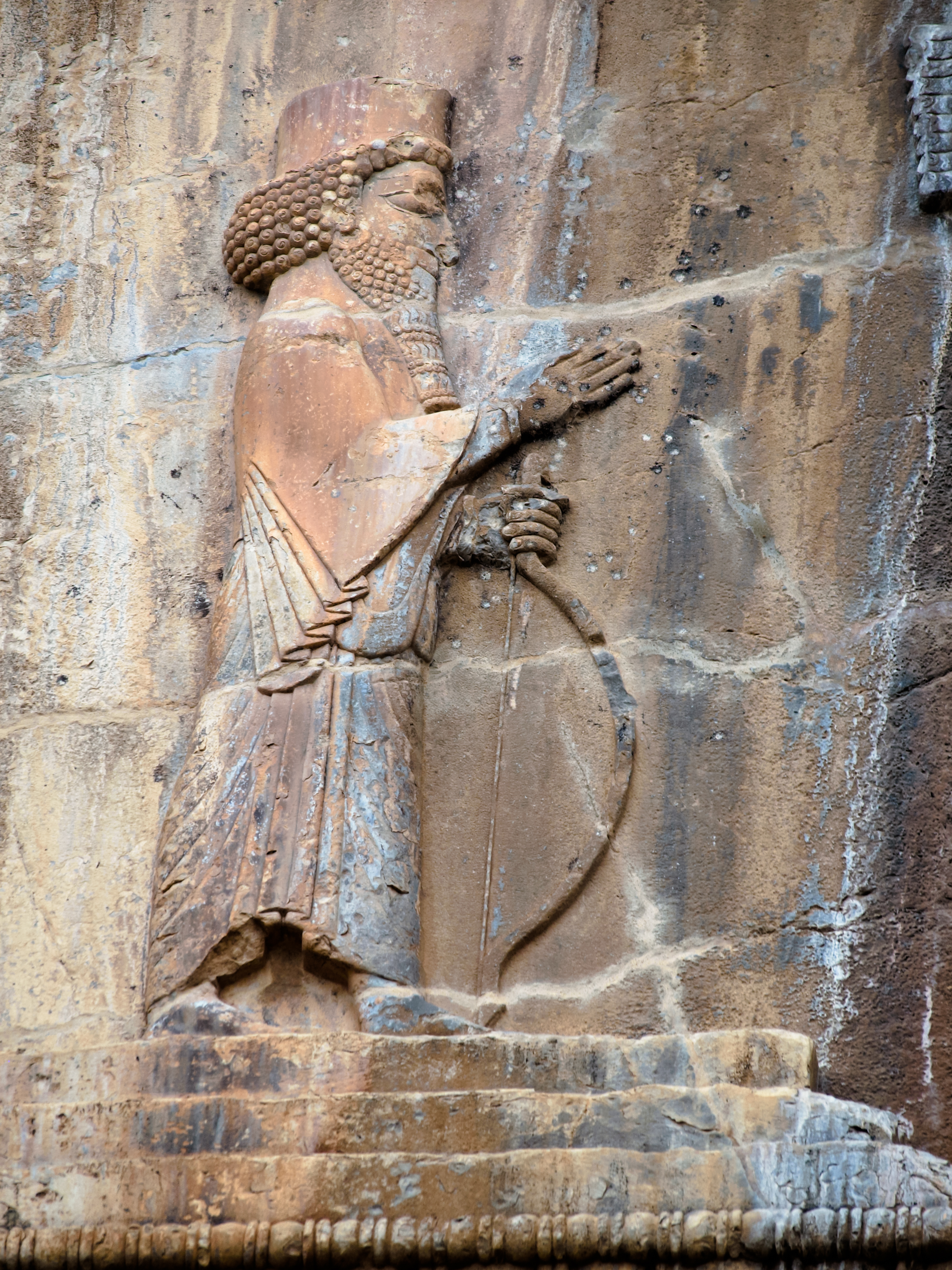
- The Rock relief of Artaxerxes III in Persepolis

King of Kings of the Achaemenid Empire
- Reign: 359/8–338 BC
- Predecessor: Artaxerxes II
- Successor: Arses

Pharaoh of Egypt
- Reign: 340/39–338 BC
- Predecessor: Nectanebo II
- Successor: Arses
- Born: Ochus
- Died: August/September 338 BC
- Burial: Persepolis
- Issue: Arses; Parysatis II
- Dynasty: Achaemenid
- Father: Artaxerxes II
- Mother: Stateira
Religion
Ancient Iranian religion
Artaxerxes III
- Military career
- Conflicts: Conflicts: Wars of Artaxerxes III; Second Egyptian Persian War

Ochus (Ancient Greek: Ὦχος Ochos), known by his dynastic name Artaxerxes III (Old Persian: 𐎠𐎼𐎫𐎧𐏁𐏂𐎠 Artaxšaçāʰ; Ancient Greek: Ἀρταξέρξης), was King of Kings of the Achaemenid Empire from 359/58 to 338 BC. He was the son and successor of Artaxerxes II and his mother was Stateira.

Before ascending the throne Artaxerxes was a satrap and commander of his father's army. Artaxerxes came to power after one of his brothers was executed, another committed suicide, the last murdered and his father, Artaxerxes II died. Soon after becoming king, Artaxerxes murdered all of the royal family to secure his place as king. He started two major campaigns against Egypt. The first campaign failed, and was followed up by rebellions throughout the western part of his empire. During the second invasion, Artaxerxes finally defeated Nectanebo II, the Pharaoh of Egypt, bringing the country back into the Persian fold after six decades.

In Artaxerxes's later years, Philip II of Macedon's power was increasing in Greece, where he tried to convince the Greeks to revolt against the Achaemenid Empire. His activities were opposed by Artaxerxes, and with his support, the city of Perinthus resisted a Macedonian siege.

There is evidence for a renewed building policy at Persepolis in his later life, where Artaxerxes erected a new palace and built his own tomb, and began long-term projects such as the Unfinished Gate. His assassination and the instability which followed put an end to any hopes of a Persian revival and the empire would soon after fall to the invading armies of Alexander the Great.

== Etymology ==
Artaxerxes is the Latin form of the Greek Artaxerxes (Αρταξέρξης), itself from the Old Persian Artaxšaçā ("whose reign is through truth"). It is known in other languages as; Elamite Ir-tak-ik-ša-iš-ša, Ir-da-ik-ša-iš-ša; Akkadian Ar-ta-ʾ-ḫa-šá-is-su; Middle Persian Ardaxšēr and New Persian Ardašīr. His personal name was Ochus (Greek: Ὦχος Ôchos; Babylonian: 𒌑𒈠𒋢 Ú-ma-kuš).

== Background ==
Ochus was the legitimate son of Artaxerxes II and his wife Stateira. He had two elder full-brothers, Ariaspes and Darius (the eldest). He also had many illegitimate brothers born to concubine mothers, whom the 2nd-century AD Roman writer Justin numbered to be 115. Out of all the sons, it was Darius who had been appointed as the heir to the empire, thus receiving the royal privilege of wearing the upright tiara. However, Artaxerxes II's long reign frustrated the latter, who was already over 50 years old. Incited by the former satrap Tiribazus, he started plotting against his father to quicken his succession. Darius expected that he would receive support from many courtiers, including fifty of his illegitimate brothers according to Justin. A eunuch discovered the conspiracy, and as a result Darius was summoned to the court and executed, "along with the wives and children of all the conspirators" (Justin). The right of succession then passed over to Ariaspes. However, Ochus, with the support of some eunuchs, (Note: According to the classical Greek writer Plutarch, Artaxerxes III was also supported by his half-sister and lover Atossa, who was allegedly at the same time a wife of Artaxerxes II. Joan. M Bigwood calls the report "fictional" and dismisses it as "an account designed to illustrate the misdeeds of a ruler widely believed by the Greek and Roman sources to be one of the most vicious of Persian kings, and those of his equally unattractive paramour Atossa.") created a series of ruses and allegations to make his legitimate brother Ariaspes go mad and commit suicide. Artaxerxes II, who disliked Ochus, appointed his favourite illegitimate son Arsames as the new crown prince. He was, however, soon killed by Arpates at the instigation of Ochus. Ochus was then finally appointed as crown prince, with Artaxerxes dying shortly after.

== Revolt of Artabazus ==
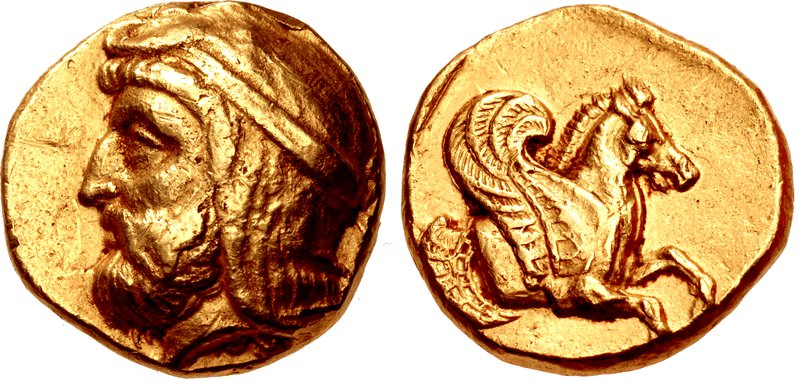
Coin of Artabazus II

At his accession (which happened sometime between November 359 and March 358 BC), Artaxerxes III demanded that all the satraps in western Anatolia were to disband their mercenary forces. This was done to diminish the power of powerful satraps and consolidate the power of the crown. Indeed, under Artaxerxes III's father, the satrap Datames had with the help of his mercenaries ruled a more or less independent state, while previously the Achaemenid prince Cyrus the Younger had almost managed to overthrow Artaxerxes II with the help of his mercenaries. All the satraps followed his order and disbanded their mercenaries. Later in 356 BC, Artaxerxes III attempted to dismiss Artabazus II from his satrapy of Hellespontine Phrygia, which resulted in the latter revolting. His royal blood through his mother Apama, a sister of Artaxerxes III, may have made the latter vigilant towards him. Artabazus' two brothers are Oxythres and Dibictus are also reported to have joined him, which implies that Artaxerxes III was targeting the whole family.

Artaxerxes III sent the other satraps in Anatolia—Tithraustes, Autophradates and Mausolus—to suppress the revolt. Artabazus quickly joined forces with the Athenian military commander Chares, who had acquired most of his disbanded mercenary unit. Together, they defeated the satraps in 355 BC and marched deeper into Greater Phrygia, ransacking the region. Artaxerxes III quickly pressured Athens to stop supporting Artabazus by the threat of war. Artabazus subsequently found a new ally in the Thebian general Pammenes, who supplied him with 5,000 soldiers in 354 BC. Further defeats were inflicted on the Achaemenid forces, but Artabazus soon fell out with Pammenes, and had him arrested. In 354/3 BC, he ceased his rebellion and fled to Macedonia, where he was well received by its king, Philip II.

== First Egyptian Campaign (351 BC) ==
In around 351 BC, Artaxerxes embarked on a campaign to recover Egypt, which had revolted under his father, Artaxerxes II. At the same time a rebellion had broken out in Asia Minor, which, being supported by Thebes, threatened to become serious. Levying a vast army, Artaxerxes marched into Egypt, and engaged Nectanebo II. After a year of fighting the Egyptian Pharaoh, Nectanebo inflicted a crushing defeat on the Persians with the support of mercenaries led by two Greek generals: the Athenian Diophantus and the Spartan Lamius. Artaxerxes was compelled to retreat and postpone his plans to reconquer Egypt.

== Rebellion of Cyprus and Sidon ==
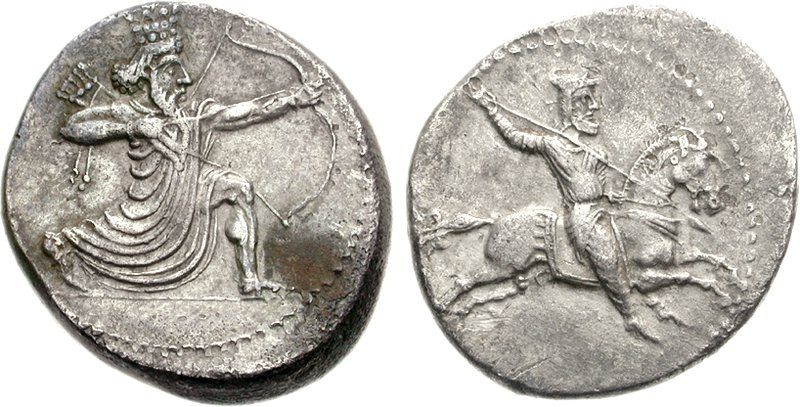
Achaemenid coinage of Idrieus of Caria during the reign of Artaxerxes III, showing the Achaemenid king on the obverse, and his satrap Idrieus on the reverse; c. 350–341 BC

Soon after this Egyptian defeat, Phoenicia, Anatolia and Cyprus declared their independence from Persian rule. In 346 BC, Artaxerxes committed responsibility for the suppression of the Cyprian rebels to Idrieus, prince of Caria, who employed 8000 Greek mercenaries and forty triremes, commanded by Phocion the Athenian, and Evagoras, son of the elder Evagoras, the Cypriot monarch. Idrieus succeeded in reducing Cyprus.

=== Sidon campaign of Belesys and Mazaeus ===
Artaxerxes initiated a counter-offensive against Sidon by commanding the satrap of Syria Belesys II and Mazaeus, the satrap of Cilicia, to invade the city and to keep the Phoenicians in check. Both satraps suffered crushing defeats at the hands of Tennes, the Sidonese king, who was aided by 4,000 Greek mercenaries sent to him by Nectanebo II and commanded by Mentor of Rhodes. As a result, the Persian forces were driven out of Phoenicia.

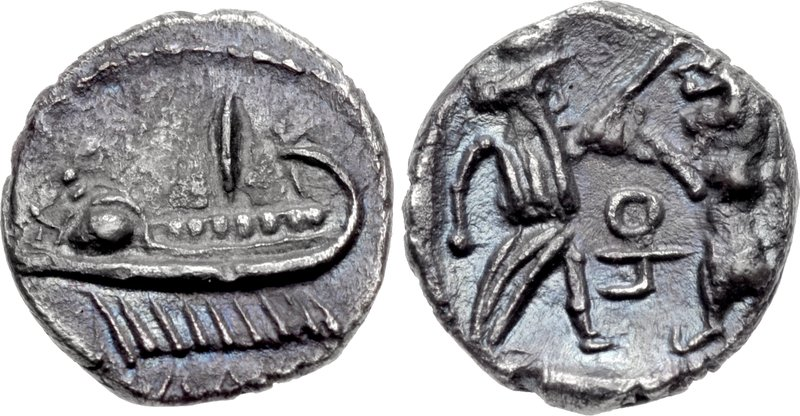
Coinage of Tennes, the king of Sidon who revolted against the Achaemenid Empire; dated 351/0 BC

=== Sidon campaign of Artaxerxes ===
After this, Artaxerxes personally led an army of 330,000 men against Sidon. Artaxerxes's army comprised 300,000 foot soldiers, 30,000 cavalry, 300 triremes, and 500 transports or provision ships. After gathering this army, he sought assistance from the Greeks. Though refused aid by Athens and Sparta, he succeeded in obtaining a thousand Theban heavy-armed hoplites under Lacrates, three thousand Argives under Nicostratus, and six thousand Æolians, Ionians, and Dorians from the Greek cities of Anatolia. This Greek support was numerically small, amounting to no more than 10,000 men, but it formed, together with the Greek mercenaries from Egypt who went over to him afterwards, the force on which he placed his chief reliance, and to which the ultimate success of his expedition was mainly due.

The approach of Artaxerxes sufficiently weakened the resolution of Tennes that he endeavoured to purchase his own pardon by delivering up 100 principal citizens of Sidon into the hands of the Persian king, and then admitting Artaxerxes within the defences of the town. Artaxerxes had the 100 citizens transfixed with javelins, and when 500 more came out as supplicants to seek his mercy, Artaxerxes consigned them to the same fate. Sidon was then burnt to the ground, either by Artaxerxes or by the Sidonian citizens. Forty thousand people died in the conflagration. Artaxerxes sold the ruins at a high price to speculators, who calculated on reimbursing themselves by the treasures which they hoped to dig out from among the ashes. Tennes was later put to death by Artaxerxes, who felt he was no longer useful. Artaxerxes later sent Jews who supported the revolt to Hyrcania, on the south coast of the Caspian Sea.

== Conquest of Egypt ==
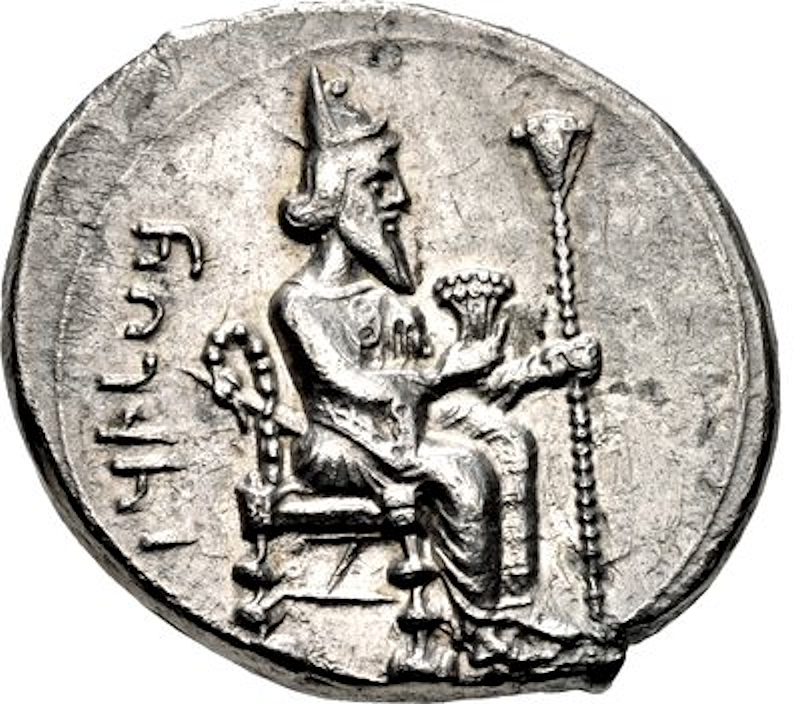
Artaxerxes III as Pharaoh of Egypt, satrapal coinage of Mazaeus in Cilicia

It was probably in 340 or 339 BC that Artaxerxes finally succeeded in reconquering Egypt. After years of extensive and meticulous preparations, the King assembled and led in person a large host which included Greek mercenaries from Thebes, Argos, Asia Minor, and those commanded by the turncoat mercenary Mentor of Rhodes, as well as a war fleet and a number of transport ships. Although Artaxerxes's army considerably outnumbered that of his Egyptian counterpart Nectanebo II, the difficulty of marching through the dry land south of Gaza and the many rivers of Lower Egypt still posed, as in previous invasions, a challenge, which was compounded, according to Diodorus Siculus, by the refusal of the Persians to make use of local guides. The invasion started poorly, as Artaxerxes lost some troops to quicksand at Barathra, and an attempt by his Theban troops to take Pelusium was successfully counterattacked by the garrison.

Artaxerxes then created three divisions of shock troops, each with a Greek commander and a Persian supervisor, while remaining himself in command of the reserves. One unit, to which he assigned the Thebans, a force of cavalry and Asiatic infantry, was tasked with taking Pelusium, while a second, commanded by Mentor of Rhodes and the eunuch Bagoas, was sent against Bubastis. The third division, which comprised the Argives, some unspecified elite troops and 80 triremes, was to establish a bridgehead on the opposite bank of the Nile. After an attempt to dislodge the Argives failed, Nectanebo retreated to Memphis, which prompted the besieged garrison of Pelusium to surrender. Bubastis likewise capitulated, as the Greek mercenaries in the garrison came to terms with the Persians after falling out with the Egyptians. This was followed by a wave of surrenders, which opened the Nile to Artaxerxes's fleet and caused Nectanebo to lose heart and abandon his country.

After this victory over the Egyptians, Artaxerxes had the city walls destroyed, started a reign of terror, and set about looting all the temples. Persia gained a significant amount of wealth from this looting. Artaxerxes also raised high taxes and attempted to weaken Egypt enough that it could never revolt against Persia. For the ten years that Persia controlled Egypt, believers in the native religion were persecuted and sacred books were stolen. Before he returned to Persia, he appointed Pherendares as satrap of Egypt. With the wealth gained from his reconquering Egypt, Artaxerxes was able to amply reward his mercenaries. He then returned to his capital having successfully completed his invasion of Egypt.

== Later years ==
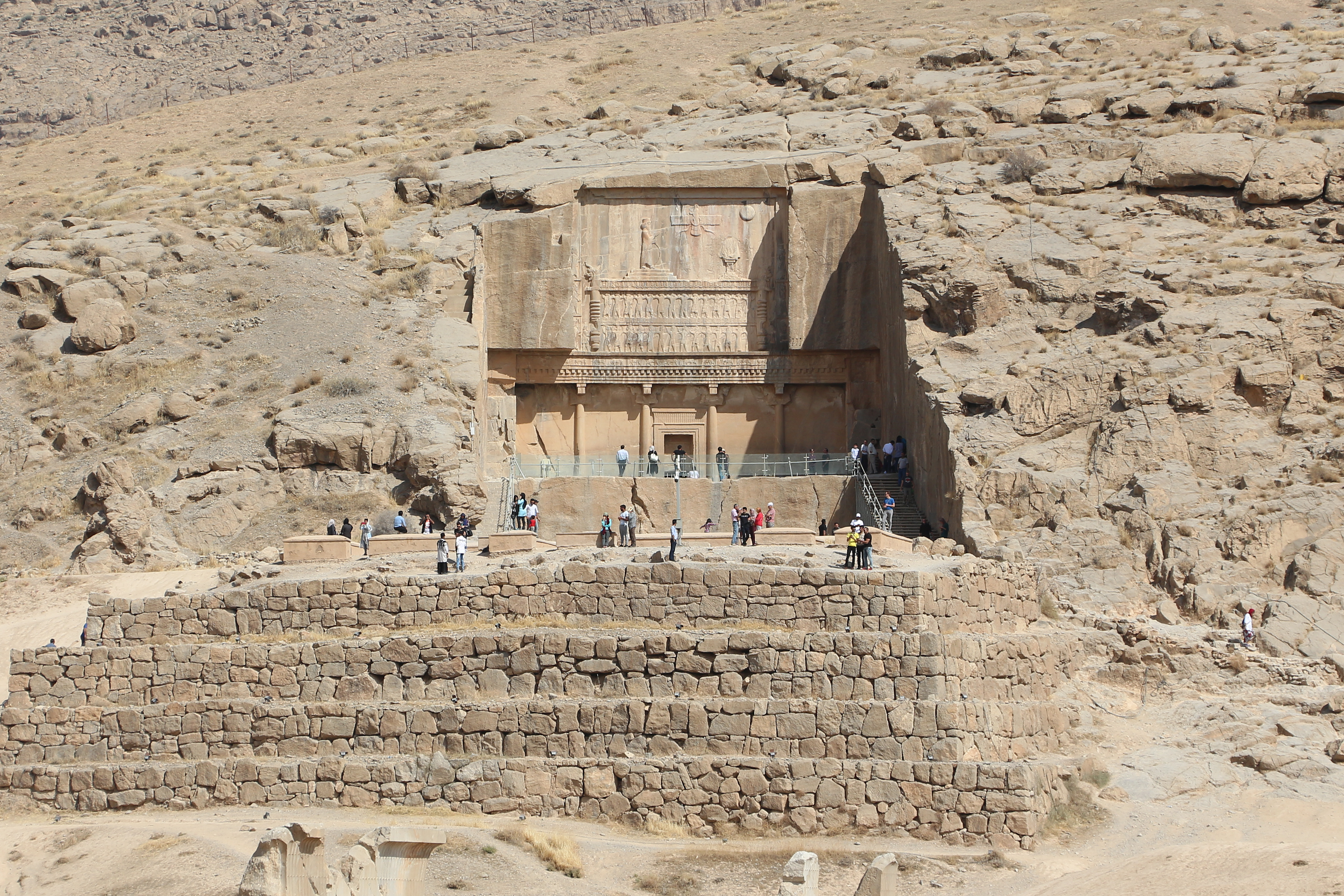
Tomb of Artaxerxes III at Persepolis.

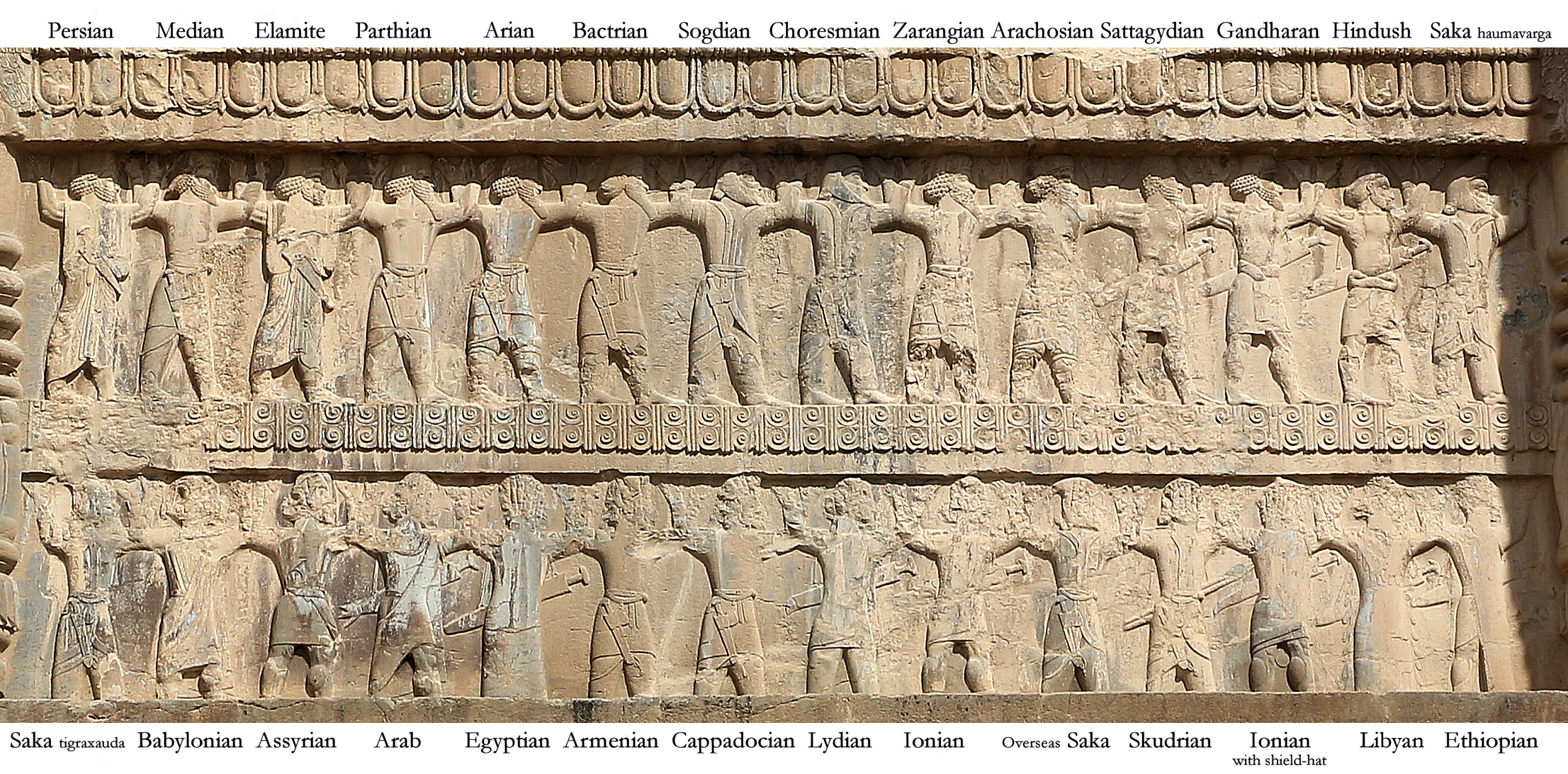
Soldiers of various ethnicities of the Achaemenid Empire, tomb of Atarxerxes III.

After his success in Egypt, Artaxerxes returned to Persia and spent the next few years effectively quelling insurrections in various parts of the Empire so that a few years after his conquest of Egypt, the Persian Empire was firmly under his control. Egypt remained a part of the Persian Empire until Alexander the Great's conquest of Egypt.

After the conquest of Egypt, there were no more revolts or rebellions against Artaxerxes. Mentor of Rhodes and Bagoas, the two generals who had most distinguished themselves in the Egyptian campaign, were advanced to posts of the highest importance. Mentor, who was governor of the entire Asiatic seaboard, was successful in reducing to subjection many of the chiefs who during the recent troubles had rebelled against Persian rule. In the course of a few years Mentor and his forces were able to bring the whole Asian Mediterranean coast into complete submission and dependence.

Bagoas went back to the Persian capital with Artaxerxes, where he took a leading role in the internal administration of the Empire and maintained tranquility throughout the rest of the Empire. During the last six years of the reign of Artaxerxes III, the Persian Empire was governed by a vigorous and successful government.

The Persian forces in Ionia and Lycia regained control of the Aegean and the Mediterranean Sea and took over much of Athens’ former island empire. In response, Isocrates of Athens started giving speeches calling for a ‘crusade against the barbarians’ but there was not enough strength left in any of the Greek city-states to answer his call.

Although there weren't any rebellions in the Persian Empire itself, the growing power and territory of Philip II of Macedon in Macedon (against which Demosthenes was in vain warning the Athenians) attracted the attention of Artaxerxes. In response, he ordered that Persian influence was to be used to check and constrain the rising power and influence of the Macedonian kingdom. In 340 BC, a Persian force was dispatched to assist the Thracian prince, Cersobleptes, to maintain his independence. Sufficient effective aid was given to the city of Perinthus that the numerous and well-appointed army with which Philip had commenced his siege of the city was compelled to give up the attempt. By the last year of Artaxerxes's rule, Philip II already had plans in place for an invasion of the Persian Empire, which would crown his career, but the Greeks would not unite with him.

In late August/late September 338 BC, the court eunuch and chiliarch (hazahrapatish) Bagoas orchestrated the poisoning and subsequent death of Artaxerxes III through the latter's own physician. (Note: According to a Babylonian tablet, Artaxerxes III "went to his fate", which is often understood to indicate death from natural causes. However, the same wording is also used to refer to the death of Xerxes I (r. 486 – 465 BC), who was in reality assassinated by his son.) Artaxerxes III's early death proved to be a problematic issue for Persia, and may have played a role in the weakening of the country. The majority of Artaxerxes III's sons, with the exception of Arses and Bisthanes, were also murdered by Bagoas. Bagoas, acting as kingmaker, put the young Arses (Artaxerxes IV) on the throne.

== Legacy ==
Historically, kings of the Achaemenid Empire were followers of Zoroaster or heavily influenced by Zoroastrian ideology.

Historically, kings of the Achaemenid Empire were followers of Zoroaster or heavily influenced by Zoroastrian ideology. The reign of Artaxerxes II saw a revival of the cult of Anahita and Mithra, when in his building inscriptions he invoked Ahura Mazda, Anahita and Mithra and even set up statues of his gods. Mithra and Anahita had until then been neglected by true Zoroastrians—they defied Zoroaster's command that God was to be represented only by the flames of a sacred fire. Artaxerxes III is thought to have rejected Anahita and worshipped only Ahuramazda and Mithra. An ambiguity in the cuneiform script of an inscription of Artaxerxes III at Persepolis suggests that he regarded the father and the son as one person, suggesting that the attributes of Ahuramazda were being transferred to Mithra. Strangely, Artaxerxes had ordered that statues of the goddess Anâhita be erected at Babylon, Damascus and Sardis, as well as at Susa, Ecbatana and Persepolis.

Artaxerxes's name appears on silver coins (modeled on Athenian ones) issued while he was in Egypt. The reverse bears an inscription in an Egyptian script, saying "Artaxerxes Pharaoh. Life, Prosperity, Wealth".

=== In literature ===
It is thought by some that the Book of Judith could have been originally based on Artaxerxes's campaign in Phoenicia, as Holofernes was the name of the brother of the Cappadocian satrap Ariarathes, the vassal of Artaxerxes. Bagoas, the general that finds Holofernes dead, was one of the generals of Artaxerxes during his campaign against Phoenicia and Egypt.

=== Construction ===
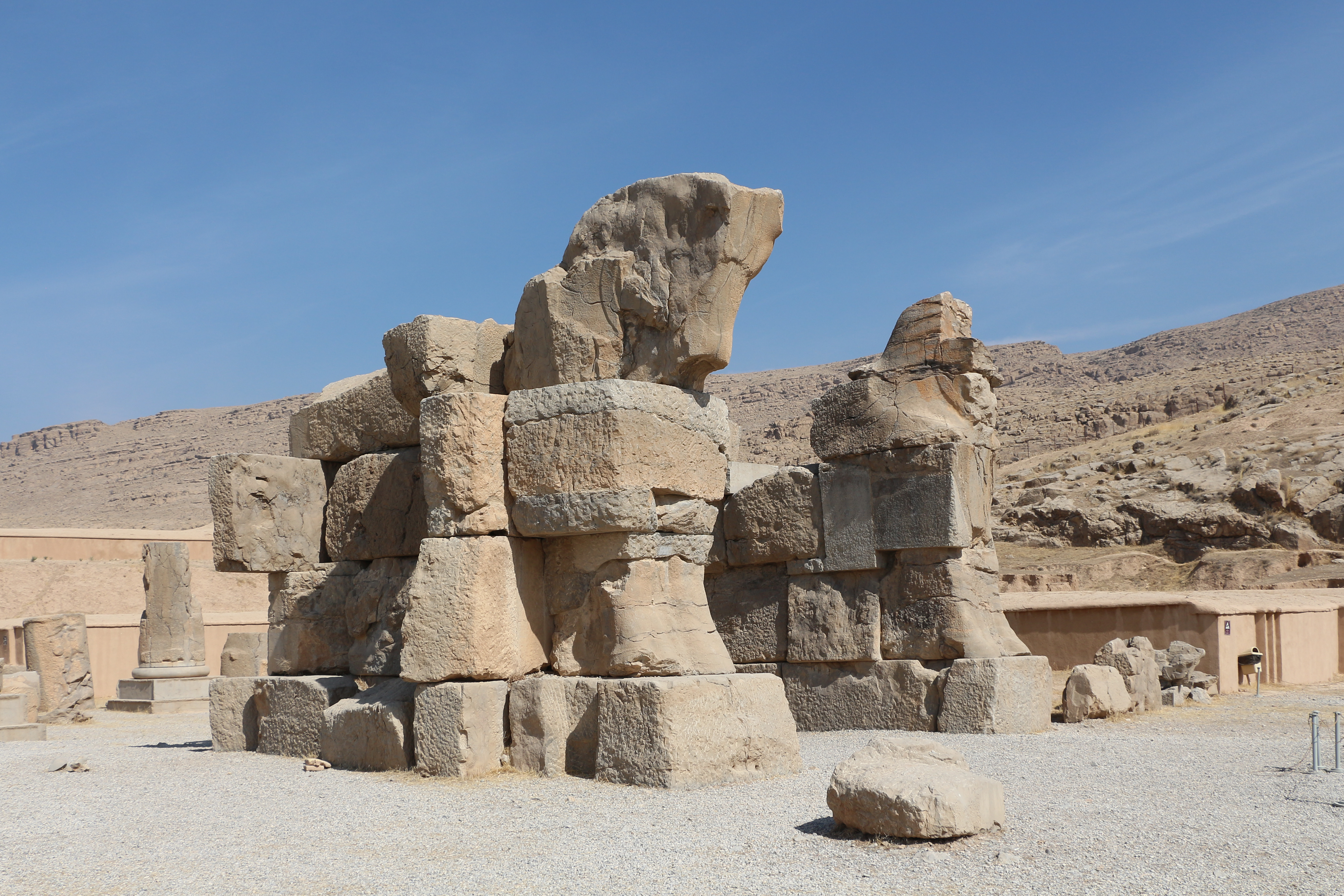
The Unfinished Gate at Persepolis gave archaeologists an insight into the construction of Persepolis.

There is evidence for a renewed building policy at Persepolis, but some of the buildings were unfinished at the time of his death. Two of his buildings at Persepolis were the Hall of Thirty-Two Columns, the purpose of which is unknown, and the palace of Artaxerxes III. The unfinished Army Road and Unfinished Gate, which connected the Gate of All Nations and the One-hundred Column Hall, gave archaeologists an insight into the construction of Persepolis. In 341 BC, after Artaxerxes returned to Babylon from Egypt, he apparently proceeded to build a great Apadana whose description is present in the works of Diodorus Siculus.

The Nebuchadnezzar II palace in Babylon was expanded during the reign of Artaxerxes III. Artaxerxes's tomb was cut into the mountain behind the Persepolis platform, next to his father's tomb.

== Family ==
Artaxerxes III was the son of Artaxerxes II and Statira. Artaxerxes II had more than 115 sons by many wives, most of them however were illegitimate. Some of Ochus' more significant siblings were Rodogune, Apama, Sisygambis, Ocha, Darius and Ariaspes, most of whom were murdered soon after his ascension.

His children were:

By Atossa:

- Artaxerxes IV Arses

By an unknown wife:

- Bisthanes
- Parysatis II, future wife of Alexander the Great.

He also married:

- An unknown daughter of his sister Ocha.
- A daughter of Oxyathres, brother of Darius III

== Bibliography ==
=== Ancient works ===
- Arrian, The Anabasis of Alexander.
- Diodorus Siculus, Bibliotheca historica.
- Justin, Epitome of the Philippic History of Pompeius Trogus.

=== Modern works ===
- Bigwood, Joan M. (2009). "Incestuous' Marriage in Achaemenid Iran: Myths and Realities". Klio. 913: 311–341. doi:10.1524/klio.2009.0015. S2CID 191672920.
- Briant, Pierre (2002). From Cyrus to Alexander: A History of the Persian Empire. Translated by Peter T. Daniels. Winona Lake, IN: Eisenbrauns. ISBN 1-57506-031-0.
- Brosius, Maria (2000). "Women i. In Pre-Islamic Persia". Encyclopaedia Iranica, Vol. London et al.
- Brosius, Maria (2020). A History of Ancient Persia: The Achaemenid Empire. John Wiley & Sons. pp. 1–288. ISBN 9781119702542.
- Dandamaev, Muhammad A. (1989). A Political History of the Achaemenid Empire. Brill. ISBN 978-9004091726.
- Depuydt, Leo (2010). "New Date for the Second Persian Conquest, End of Pharaonic and Manethonian Egypt: 340/39 B.C.E.". Journal of Egyptian History. 3 (2): 191–230. doi:10.1163/187416610X541709.
- Frye, R. N. (1983). "The political history of Iran under the Sasanians". In Yarshater, Ehsan (ed.). The Cambridge History of Iran: The Seleucid, Parthian and Sasanian Periods. Vol. 3(1). Cambridge: Cambridge University Press. ISBN 0-521-20092-X.
- LeCoq, P. (1986). "Arses". Encyclopaedia Iranica, Vol. II, Fasc. 5. p. 548.
- Lloyd, Alan B. (2019). "The Defence of Egypt in the Fourth Century BC: Forts and Sundry Failures". In Jeremy Armstrong & Matthew Trundle (eds.). Brill's Companion to Sieges in the Ancient Mediterranean. Leiden: Brill. pp. 111–134. ISBN 978-90-04-37361-7.
- Ruzicka, Stephen (2012). Trouble in the West: Egypt and the Persian Empire, 525–332 BC. Oxford University Press. pp. 1–311. ISBN 9780199766628.
- Schmitt, R. (1986a). "Artaxerxes III". Encyclopaedia Iranica, Vol. II, Fasc. 6. pp. 658–659.
- Schmitt, R. (1986b). "Artaxerxes". Encyclopaedia Iranica, Vol. II, Fasc. 6. pp. 654–655.
- Schmitt, R. (1986c). "Artaxerxes II". Encyclopaedia Iranica, Vol. II, Fasc. 6. pp. 656–658.
- Waters, Matt (2014). Ancient Persia: A Concise History of the Achaemenid Empire, 550–330 BCE. Cambridge University Press. pp. 1–272. ISBN 9781107652729.
- Wiesehöfer, Joseph (1986). "Ardašīr I i. History". Encyclopaedia Iranica, Vol. II, Fasc. 4. pp. 371–376.

Artaxerxes III Achaemenid dynasty Died: 338 BC
Preceded by Artaxerxes II	King of Kings of Persia; 358–338 BC	Succeeded by Artaxerxes IV Arses
Preceded by Nectanebo II	Pharaoh of Egypt; XXXI Dynasty; 340–338 BC	Succeeded by Artaxerxes IV Arses
