= Parysatis II =

Wife of Alexander the Great

Parysatis (Ancient Greek: Παρύσατις), the youngest daughter of Artaxerxes III of Persia, married Alexander the Great in 324 BC at the Susa weddings. She may have been murdered by Alexander's first wife, Roxana, in 323 BC.

== Early life ==
After her father's murder in 338 BC, her brothers were likewise all murdered, except Arses of Persia and Bisthanes. Arses ruled briefly, before being succeeded by their second cousin, Darius III, in 336 BC. It is likely that after her father's death, Parysatis and her sisters continued to live at the Persian court. During Darius's campaign against the invasion by Alexander the Great, Parysatis and her sisters, along with many other members of the Persian elite, accompanied the Persian army. Following the Battle of Issus in 333 BC, Parysatis and many of her relatives were captured in Damascus by Macedonian general Parmenion.

== Alexander III of Macedonia ==
It is possible that Parysatis remained at Susa with the women of Darius's family while Alexander led a campaign in India. According to Arrian, in 324 BC, Parysatis married Alexander at Susa. On the same day, Alexander married Darius's eldest daughter, Stateira. By wedding both women, Alexander cemented his ties to both branches of the royal family of the Achaemenid Empire. The marriage celebration lasted five days. During that time, 90 other Persian noblewomen were married to Macedonian and other Greek soldiers who were loyal to Alexander.

After the marriage, there are no further written accounts that refer to Parysatis by name; however, some historians, including Elizabeth Donnelly Carney, believe that in an account of the death of Stateira, Plutarch misidentified Parysatis as Stateira's sister Drypetis. In Plutarch's history, after Alexander's death in 323 BC, his first wife, Roxana, ordered the murder of Stateira and her sister in order to cement her own position and that of her son, Alexander IV. Carney maintains that Parysatis "makes more sense as a murder victim". If Parysatis were Alexander's wife, then, like Stateira, there was a possibility that she could be or claim to be pregnant or to have given birth to a child, and thus pose a threat to Roxana.

== Sources ==
- Carney, Elizabeth Donnelly (2000), Women and Monarchy in Macedonia, Norman, OK: University of Oklahoma Press, ISBN 0-8061-3212-4
- Garthwaite, Gene R. (2005), The Persians, Malden, MA: Blackwell Publishing, ISBN 1-55786-860-3
- O'Brien, John Maxwell (2001), Alexander the Great: The Invisible Enemy - A Biography, New York: Routledge, ISBN 0-415-10617-6
