= Second Achaemenid conquest of Egypt =

Ancient Persian military campaign (340/339 BC)

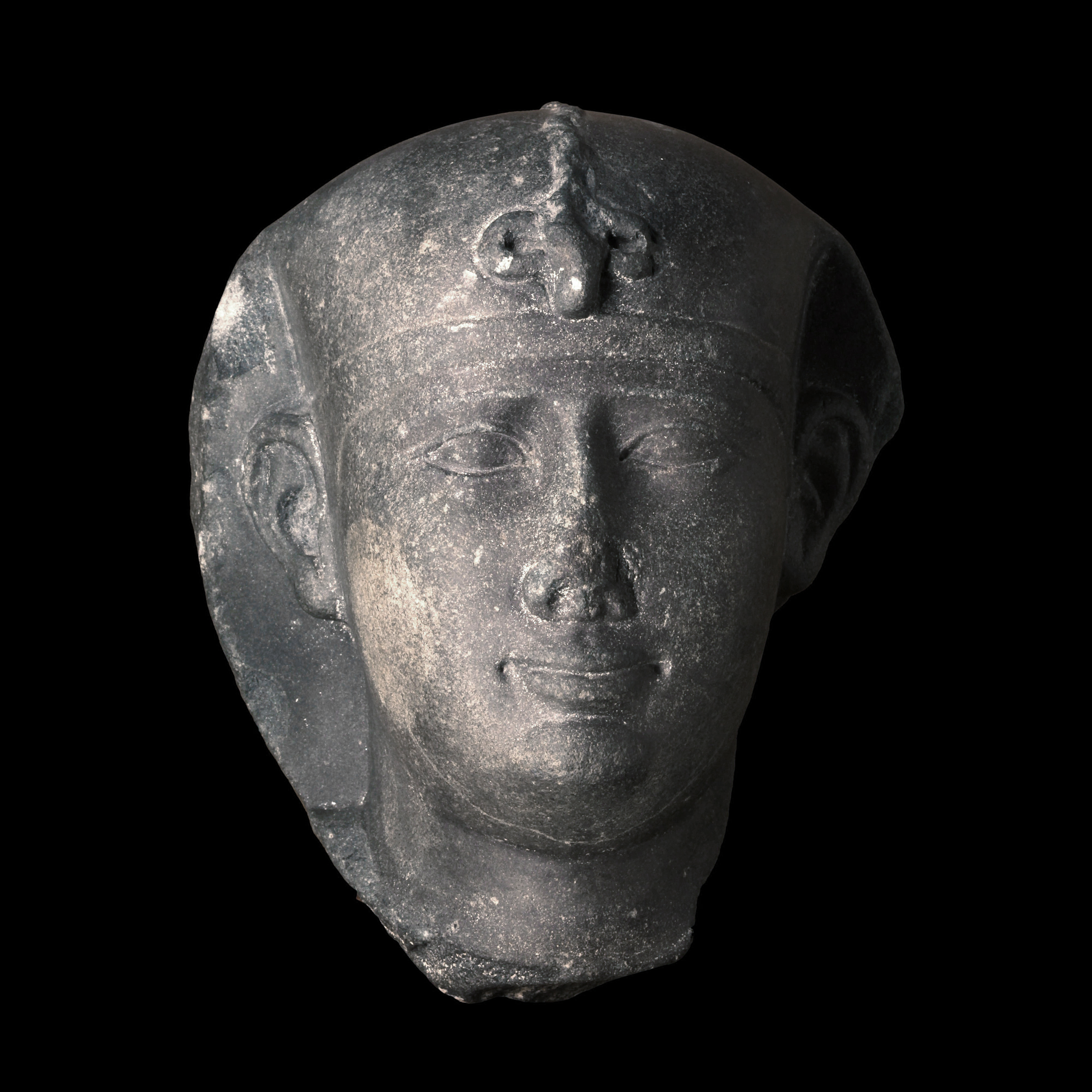
Nectanebo II, deposed by the Achaemenid Empire c. 343–339 BC. He is sometimes considered the last native Egyptian pharaoh.

The second Achaemenid conquest of Egypt took place in 340 or 339 BC.

Egypt had broken away from the Persian Empire in the end of the 5th century BC, and since then the Persians had made several unsuccessful attempts to reconquer it. Egypt was ruled by its twenty-eighth dynasty from 404 to 398 BC and the twenty-ninth dynasty from 398 to 380; the thirtieth dynasty had ruled since 380 BC. Nectanebo II came to the throne in 360 BC.

Artaxerxes III, after a failed attempt in 351, conducted the conquest in person following years of extensive and meticulous preparations. His force included Greek mercenaries from Thebes, Argos and Asia Minor, as well as a war fleet and a number of transport ships. Although the Persian army was said to have outnumbered that of the Egyptian pharaoh Nectanebo II, the invasion started inauspiciously when Artaxerxes lost some troops to quicksand at Barathra, and the fortress of Pelusium resisted an attempt to take it.

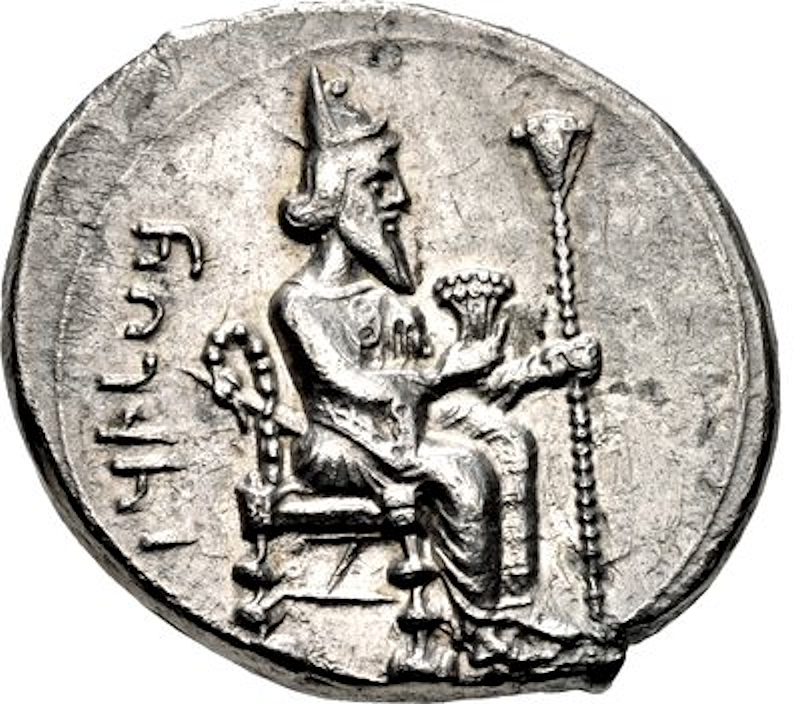
Artaxerxes III as Pharaoh of Egypt, satrapal coinage of Mazaeus in Cilicia.

Artaxerxes deployed three divisions of shock troops, each with a Greek commander and a Persian supervisor. One unit, to which he assigned the Thebans, a force of cavalry and Asiatic infantry, was tasked with taking Pelusium, while a second, commanded by turncoat mercenary Mentor of Rhodes and the eunuch Bagoas, was sent against Bubastis. The third division, which comprised the Argives, some unspecified elite troops and 80 triremes, was to establish a bridgehead on the opposite bank of the Nile. The Theban force set about diverting a nearby canal so that siege engines could be brought up, and although the walls of Pelusium were battered, the defenders (apparently commanded by a Spartan) were able to set up new walls and wooden defensive towers further inside. The Argive troops landed in their destination and beat off an Egyptian attempt to dislodge them; Nectanebo failed to mount an effective counterattack and fell back to Memphis. At this, the Egyptians became demoralized, which caused the besieged at Pelusium to surrender. Bubastis capitulated with little resistance to Mentor and Bagoas, and this was followed by a wave of surrenders, which opened the Nile to Artaxerxes's fleet. The pharaoh Nectanebo lost heart and abandoned his country.

After his victory, Artaxerxes was said to have demolished the walls of important Egyptian cities, plundered temples and even murdered the sacred Apis bull, although the latter is likely to have been a propaganda invention of Egyptian priests.
