= Arses of Persia =

King of the Achaemenid Empire from 338 to 336 BC

Arses 𐎠𐎼𐏁𐎣
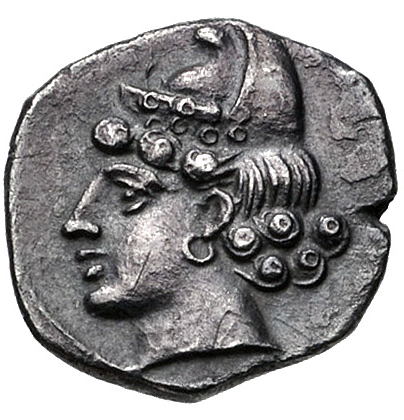
- Probable portrait of Arses, wearing the Egyptian Pharaonic crown.

King of Kings of the Achaemenid Empire
- Reign: 338–336 BC
- Predecessor: Artaxerxes III
- Successor: Darius III

Pharaoh of Egypt
- Reign: 338–336 BC
- Predecessor: Artaxerxes III
- Successor: Darius III
- Died: 336 BC
Regnal name
- Artaxerxes IV
- Dynasty: Achaemenid
- Father: Artaxerxes III
- Mother: Atossa
- Religion: Ancient Iranian religion

Arses (Old Persian: *R̥šā; Ancient Greek: Ἀρσής), also known by his regnal name Artaxerxes IV (/ˌɑːrtəˈzɜːrksiːz/; Old Persian: 𐎠𐎼𐎫𐎧𐏁𐏂𐎠 Artaxšaçāʰ; Ancient Greek: Ἀρταξέρξης), was the twelfth Achaemenid King of Kings from 338 to 336 BC.

Arses ascended the throne, after his father Artaxerxes III—who had caused a resurgence of the Persian Empire—was poisoned by the eunuch Bagoas. The latter put Arses on the throne with the expectation of being able to control him. With the weakening of the Achaemenid Empire from the assassination of Artaxerxes III and the succession of Arses, the Greek league sent troops into Asia in 336.

Arses, in an attempt to free himself from Bagoas' influences, tried to have the eunuch poisoned; but did not succeed, instead succumbing to poison himself at the orders of Bagoas. Bagoas put Arses's cousin Darius III on the throne after him.

== Name ==
He is known as Arses in Greek sources and that seems to have been his real name, but the Xanthus trilingue and potsherds from Samaria report that he took the royal name of Artaxerxes IV, following his father and grandfather.

Arses is the Greek form of the Old Persian R̥šā, which is also attested in the Avestan form Aršan- and is used in multiple Old Persian compound-names, such as Aršaka, Aršāma, and Xšayaaršan. The term is linguistically related to Greek arsēn, meaning "male, manly".

== Biography ==
Arses was the youngest son of Artaxerxes III and his wife Atossa. Arses had several brothers, only one whose name is attested, a certain Bisthanes, as well as a sister, Parysatis II. Persia was experiencing a resurgence under Artaxerxes III, who reorganized his empire, and suppressed revolts throughout the country. However, the fortunes of Persia came to an abrupt end in autumn of 338, when Artaxerxes III was murdered by the ambitious eunuch and chiliarch Bagoas, who had the king poisoned. Artaxerxes III's early death proved to be a problematic issue for Persia, and may have played a role in the weakening of the country. The majority of Artaxerxes III's sons, with the exception of Arses and Bisthanes, were also murdered by Bagoas. Bagoas, who wanted to be kingmaker, put the young Arses on the throne.

On his ascension to the throne, Arses most likely assumed the regnal name of Artaxerxes IV. He was put on the throne by Bagoas due to his youth, which the latter sought to take advantage of in order to control him. Around the same period, most of the Greek city-states had joined the Greek league under the leadership of the Macedonian king Philip II, who took advantage of the events in Persia by demanding compensation from the country for helping the town of Perinthus during the reign of Artaxerxes III. Arses declined, and as a result, a Greek expedition was started with Philip II as general, who sent 10,000 Macedonian soldiers into Asia in 336 BC. At the same time, however, Arses was determined on trying to free himself from Bagoas' authority and influence; he made an unsuccessful effort to have the latter poisoned, only to be poisoned himself along with the rest of his family by Bagoas, who put Arses's cousin Darius III on the throne. Macedonian propaganda, made in order to legitimize the conquests of Alexander the Great a few years later, accused Darius III of playing a key role in the murder of Arses, who was portrayed as the last king of the Achaemenid royal house.

== Coinage ==
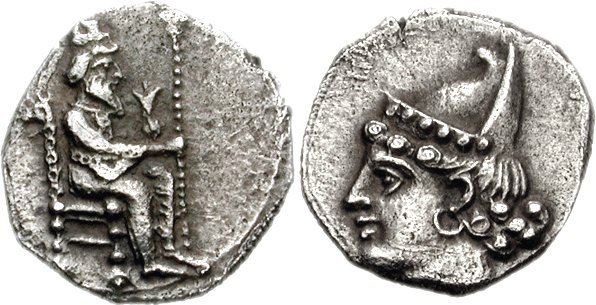
Coinage of Mazaios, Satrap of Cilicia, 361/0-334 BC, thought to represent Artaxerxes III on the obverse, and a young Arses on the reverse

There is no dynastic coinage of Artaxerxes IV, but it is thought he may be depicted as a young ruler wearing the Pharaonic crown on the reverse of some of the contemporary coinage of satrap Mazaios in Cilicia, while his father Artaxerxes III appears seated, also in Pharaonic dress, on the obverse.

== Bibliography ==
=== Ancient works ===
- Arrian, The Anabasis of Alexander.
- Diodorus Siculus, Bibliotheca historica.
- Justin, Epitome of the Philippic History of Pompeius Trogus.

=== Modern works ===
- Briant, Pierre (2002). From Cyrus to Alexander: A History of the Persian Empire. Eisenbrauns. pp. 1–1196. ISBN 9781575061207.
- LeCoq, P. (1986). "Arses". In Yarshater, Ehsan (ed.). Encyclopædia Iranica. Vol. II/5: Armenia and Iran IV–Art in Iran I. London and New York: Routledge & Kegan Paul. p. 548. ISBN 978-0-71009-105-5.
- Schmitt, R. (1986). "Artaxerxes III". In Yarshater, Ehsan (ed.). Encyclopædia Iranica. Vol. II/6: Art in Iran I–ʿArūż. London and New York: Routledge & Kegan Paul. pp. 658–659. ISBN 978-0-71009-106-2.
- Waters, Matt (2014). Ancient Persia: A Concise History of the Achaemenid Empire, 550–330 BCE. Cambridge University Press. ISBN 978-0521253697.

Arses of Persia Achaemenid dynasty Born: c. 357 BC Died: 336 BC
Preceded by Artaxerxes III	King of Kings of Persia; 338–336 BC	Succeeded by Darius III
Preceded by Artaxerxes III	Pharaoh of Egypt; XXXI Dynasty; 338–336 BC	Succeeded by Darius III
