= Sasanian Egypt =

Province of the Sasanian Empire (618–628)

Agiptus
- Province of the Sasanian Empire
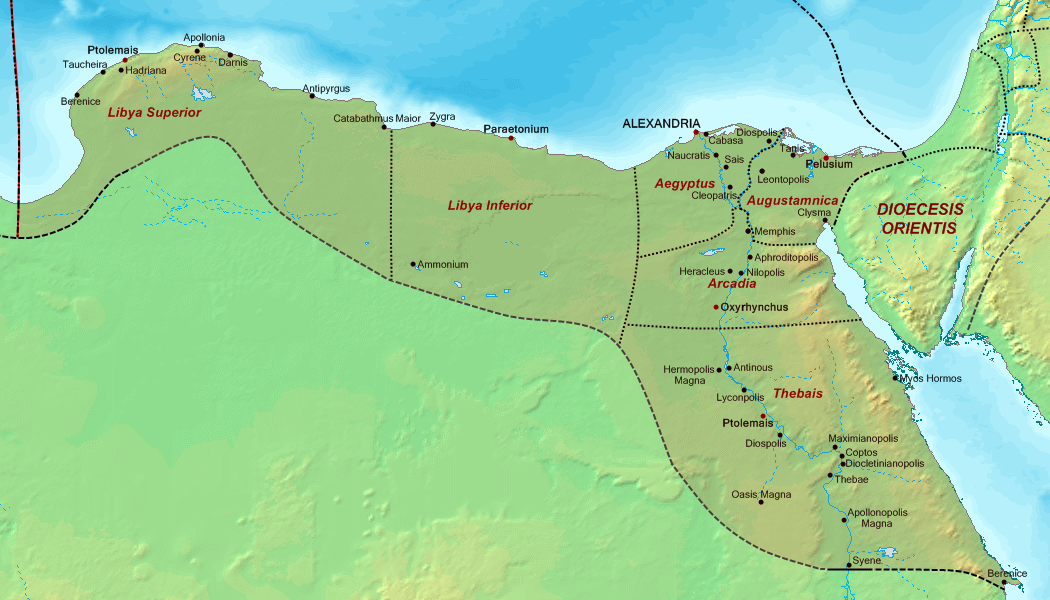
- Map of the Diocese of Egypt, which was controlled by the Sasanians.
- Capital: Alexandria
- Historical era: Late Antiquity
  - Established: 618
  - Status quo ante bellum: 628
Preceded by	Succeeded by
Roman Egypt	Roman Egypt
- Today part of: Egypt; Libya

Sasanian Egypt (known in Middle Persian sources as Agiptus) refers to the brief rule of Egypt and parts of Libya by the Sasanian Empire, following the Sasanian conquest of Egypt. It was one of the last phases of late antique Egypt, lasting from 618 to 628, until the Sasanian general Shahrbaraz made an alliance with the Byzantine emperor Heraclius to have control over Egypt returned to him.

== History ==
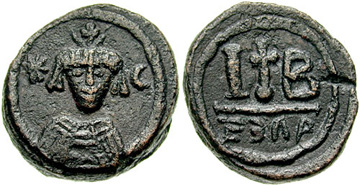
Byzantine-style coinage struck in Alexandria imitating Khosrow II.

Egypt was conquered in 618 by the prominent Sasanian military leader Shahrbaraz, who governed the province briefly until he appointed Shahralanyozan as the new governor. Sahralanyozan held the title of karframan-idar ("steward of the court") and was the most powerful Iranian in Egypt. Besides being governor of Egypt, he was also the tax-collector of the province, and most likely resided in Faiyum. In Middle Persian texts, the country is known as Agiptus and is described as follows: agiptus būm kē misr-iz xwānēnd 'the land of Agiptus which is also called Misr'. The Nile is termed as rōd ī nīl. Several cities of the country are mentioned, such as Touphis, Kynon, Babylon, including some others, which displays the subjugation of the Sasanians in the area.

Although Egypt suffered much damage during its invasion by the Sasanians, after the conquest was complete, peace, toleration and rehabilitation followed. Furthermore, the Sasanians retained the same administrative structure as the Byzantine Empire. The Sasanians did not try to force the population of Egypt to renounce their religion and practise Zoroastrianism. They did, however, persecute the Byzantine Church whilst supporting the Monophysite Church. The Copts took advantage of the circumstances and obtained control over many of the Orthodox churches. There were numerous Sasanian stations in the country, which included Elephantine, Herakleia, Oxyrhynchus, Kynon, Theodosiopolis, Hermopolis, Antinopolis, Kosson, Lykos, Diospolis, and Maximianopolis. The assignment of those stations was to collect taxes and get supplies for the military. Several papyrus papers mentions the collection of taxes by the Sasanians, which shows that they used the same method of the Byzantines for collecting taxes. Another papyrus mentions an Iranian and his sister, which indicates that some families had settled in Egypt along with the soldiers.

In 626, Shahrbaraz quarrelled with the Sasanian king Khosrow II (r. 590–628) and mutinied against him. It is not known whom Sahralanzoyan supported, since he is not mentioned in any source thereafter and Shahrbaraz is described as the ruler of the province. Following the end of the Byzantine–Sasanian war in 628, by 630/1, Egypt had returned to Byzantine hands. Although Sasanian rule in Egypt wasn't long compared to that of the Byzantines, some marks of their influences is still present today; the Coptic New Year celebration called Nayrouz, where martyrs and confessors are honoured, stems from the Iranian New Year celebration Nowruz. Another commemoration which is related to the Sasanians is the Holy Cross Day, that celebrates the discovery of the cross that Jesus was crucified on and its homecoming to Jerusalem in 628. Furthermore, Sasanian influence on Coptic art is also apparent.

== List of governors ==
Date	Governor
618–621	Shahrbaraz
621–626(?)	Sahralanyozan
626(?)–628	Shahrbaraz

== See also ==
- Twenty-seventh Dynasty of Egypt
- Kisra legend, a migration story of a Persian force from Egypt to Nigeria

== Notes ==
a: Misr is the Arabic name for Egypt.

== Sources ==
- Altheim-Stiehl, Ruth (1998). "EGYPT iv. Relations in the Sasanian period". Encyclopaedia Iranica, Vol. VIII, Fasc. 3. pp. 252–254.
- Jalalipour, Saeid (2014). Persian Occupation of Egypt 619-629: Politics and Administration of Sasanians (PDF). Sasanika.
- Howard-Johnston, James (2006). East Rome, Sasanian Persia And the End of Antiquity: Historiographical And Historical Studies. Ashgate Publishing. ISBN 0-86078-992-6.
- Dodgeon, Michael H.; Greatrex, Geoffrey; Lieu, Samuel N. C. (2002). The Roman Eastern Frontier and the Persian Wars (Part I, 226–363 AD). Routledge. pp. 196–97. ISBN 0-415-00342-3.
- Frye, R. N. (1993). "The Political History of Iran under the Sassanids". In Yarshater, Ehsan; Bailey, Harold (eds.). The Cambridge History of Iran. Cambridge University Press. ISBN 978-0-521-20092-9.
- Daryaee, Touraj (6 June 2023). Middle Persian Papyri from the Sasanian Occupation of Egypt in the Seventh Century CE (I) (PDF). Sasanika.
- Weber, Dieter (2005). "PAHLAVI PAPYRI". Encyclopaedia Iranica. pp. 325–326.
