= Belesys I =

Belesys I (Babylonian: Bēlšunu) was the ruler of Achaemenid Syria as the satrap of Eber-Nari from 407 to 401 BCE. His father's name was Bēl-uṣuršu. (Note: Belesys, named in Xenophon's Anabasis (1.4.10, 7.8.25), been variously identified with either Bēlšunu (son) or Bēl-uṣuršu (father). Manning & Collins (2016, p. 111) equates him with Bēlšunu, while Dandamayev (1996) instead equates him with Bēl-uṣuršu.)

== Details ==
Belesys' name is recorded (as Bēlšunu) on clay tablets from Babylon, where he officiated between the years 421 and 414 BC. It is thought that he was the vice governor and subordinate of the Babylonian satrap Gobryas/Gubāru during this time, though it has also been suggested that Belesys/Bēlšunu and Gobryas/Gubāru were the same individual.

From 407 to 401 B.C. BC Belesys I ruled Achaemenid Syria as the satrap of Eber-Nari, as mentioned by Xenophon in his Anabasis (1.4.10). On his journey to Mesopotamia, the rebellious prince Cyrus the Younger is noted to have burnt down the palace and gardens of Belesys on the Dardas River near Aleppo – an "irreversible hostile act" that suggests Cyrus and the satrap were "implacable foes".

Belesys I had a son, Marduk-erība (or Erībā), who died in 402 B.C. himself officiated as satrap of Babylonia. Another later satrap of Syria, Belesys II, was probably one of his descendants.
