= Cleomenes of Naucratis =

Nomarch of Egypt under Macedonian rule

Cleomenes
- Satrap and Nomarch of the Arabian Nome
- Dynasty: Argead dynasty
- Pharaoh: Alexander the Great, Philip III Arrhidaeus

Cleomenes (Greek: Kλεoμένης Kleoménes; died 322 BC), a Greek of Naucratis in Ancient Egypt, was appointed by Alexander III of Macedon as nomarch of the Arabian Nome (νoμoς) of Egypt and receiver of the tributes from all the nomes (districts) of ancient Egypt and the neighbouring part of Africa (331 BC).

== Life ==
Some of the ancient writers say that Alexander made Cleomenes satrap of Egypt, but Arrian expressly states that the other nomarchs were independent of him, except that they had to pay to him the tributes of their districts. It would, however, appear that he had no difficulty in extending his depredations over all Egypt, and it is possible that he would have taken the title of satrap. It is told that his rapacity knew no bounds, that he exercised his office solely for his own advantage.

When there was a scarcity of grain, which was less severe in Egypt than in the neighbouring countries, he at first forbade its export from Egypt. But when the nomarchs represented to him that this measure prevented them from raising the proper amount of tribute, he permitted the export of grain, but placed a heavy export duty on it. On another occasion, when the price of grain was ten drachmas, Cleomenes bought it up and sold it at 32 drachmas; and in other ways he interfered with the markets for his own gain.

Alexander had entrusted him to build the new city of Alexandria. Cleomenes informed the people of Canopus, then the chief emporium of Egypt, that he must move them to the new city. To avert such an evil they provided him with a large sum of money. But, as the building of Alexandria advanced, he again demanded that the people of Canopus pay him a large sum of money, which they could not pay. So this provided him with the excuse for removing them.

He also made money out of the superstitions of the people. After one of his boys had been killed by a crocodile, he ordered the crocodiles be destroyed. But, in return for all the money which the priests gathered to save their sacred animals, he revoked his order. On another occasion he sent for the priests, and informed them that the religious establishment was too expensive and must be reduced. So the priests handed over to him the treasures of their temples. So he then left them undisturbed.

Alexander was informed of Cleomenes' actions, but found it convenient to take no notice of them. But after his return to Babylon in 323 BC, he wrote to Cleomenes, commanding him to erect at Alexandria a splendid monument to Hephaestion, and promised that if this work was zealously performed, he would overlook his misconduct.

In the distribution of Alexander's empire after his death (323 BC), Cleomenes remained in Egypt as satrap under Ptolemy, who put him to death on the suspicion of his favouring Perdiccas. The effect, if not also a cause, of this act was that Ptolemy was then able to take possession of Cleomenes' accumulated wealth, which amounted to 8000 gold talents.

Preceded by Mazaces	Satrap of Egypt; 332 - 13 June 323 BCE	Succeeded by Ptolemy Soter
