= Barate =

Town of ancient Lycaonia

Barate Βάρατα
- Settlement
- Location in Turkey
- Coordinates: 37°25′51″N 33°07′02″E
- Country: Turkey
- Province: Karaman
- District: Karaman District
- Time zone: UTC+3 (TRT)
- Area code: 0338

Barate (Ancient Greek: Βαράτη), Barata (Βάρατα), or Baratta (Βάραττα), was a town of ancient Lycaonia, on the road from Iconium to Tyana, 50 M.P. from the former. In some itineraria the name is also spelt Barathra. It was inhabited during Roman and Byzantine times.

Its site is tentatively located near Kızılkale, Karaman, Karaman Province, Turkey.

Barata is a titular bishopric of the Catholic Church.
