= Bagoas =

Persian Achaemenid Empire vizier (died 336 BC)

Bagoas (Old Persian: Bagāvahyā; Ancient Greek: Βαγώας, Bagōas; died 336 BCE) was a prominent Persian official who served as the vizier (Chief Minister) of the Achaemenid Empire until his death.

== Biography ==
Bagoas was a eunuch who later became vizier to Artaxerxes III. In this role, he allied himself with the Rhodian mercenary general Mentor, and with his help succeeded in once again making Egypt a province of the Achaemenids, probably from 342 BCE. Mentor became general of the maritime provinces, suppressed the rebels in Egypt and sent Greek mercenaries to the king, while Bagoas administered the satrapies and gained such power that he was almost the real master of the Empire towards the end of Artaxerxes III's reign (Diod. xvi. 50; cf. Didymus, Comm. in Demosth. Phil. vi. 5).

Arses of Persia was the youngest son of Artaxerxes III and Atossa and was not expected to succeed to the throne. His unexpected rise to the throne came in 338 BCE as a result of the death of his father, who, according to the Greek work of Diodorus Siculus, was poisoned along with most of his family by Bagoas with the assistance of a physician, when the vizier fell out of favour with him. A cuneiform tablet in the British Museum (BM 71537), however, suggests Artaxerxes III died from natural causes.

Bagoas sought to remain in office by replacing Artaxerxes with his son, Arses (Artaxerxes IV), whom he thought easier to control. Arses remained little more than a puppet-king during the two years of his reign while Bagoas acted as the power behind the throne. Eventually, disgruntled by this state of affairs and possibly influenced by the nobles of the Royal Court, who generally held Bagoas in contempt, Arses started planning Bagoas' murder. However, Bagoas again acted first in order to protect himself and managed to poison and kill Arses. Bagoas then raised a cousin of Arses to the throne as Darius III.

When Darius attempted to become independent of the powerful vizier, Bagoas tried to poison him too; but Darius was warned and forced Bagoas to drink the poison himself (Diod. xvii. 5; Johann. Antioch, p. 38, 39 ed. Müller; Arrian ii. 14. 5; Curt. vi. 4. 10).

According to the Bibliotheca historica by Diodorus Siculus, Bagoas became very wealthy by confiscating the sacred writings of the Egyptian temples and giving them back to the priests for large bribes (Diod. XVI. 51). When the high priest of Jerusalem, Johannes, murdered his brother Jesus in the temple, Bagoas (who had supported Jesus) put a new tax on the Jews and entered the temple, saying that he was purer than he who was murdered in the temple (Joseph. Ant. xi. 7.1).

A later story, that Bagoas was an Egyptian and killed Artaxerxes III because he had killed the living Apis (Aelian, Var. Hist. vi. 8), is without historical basis.

Bagoas' house in Susa, with rich treasures, was presented by Alexander the Great to Parmenion (Plut. Alex. 39); his gardens in Babylon, with the best species of palms, are mentioned by Theophrastus (Hist. Plant, ii. 6; Plin. Nat. Hist. xiii. 41).

Plutarch reports an angry letter from Alexander to Darius, naming Bagoas as one of the persons who organized the murder of his father, Philip II of Macedon.

== In fiction ==
- Bagoas is featured as a character in the ancient Greek novel Aethiopica by Heliodorus of Emesa. In the novel, he is portrayed as a trusty eunuch servant of the Persian satrap of Memphis. In the course of events, he is captured by the Ethiopian king and assimilated as a servant in the Ethiopian court.
- Bagoas is mentioned in Mary Renault's novel The Persian Boy as the cause of the narrator's enslavement and castration.
