= Mazaeus =

Persian noble and Achaeminid and Hellenistic satrap (died 328 BC)

- Mazaios
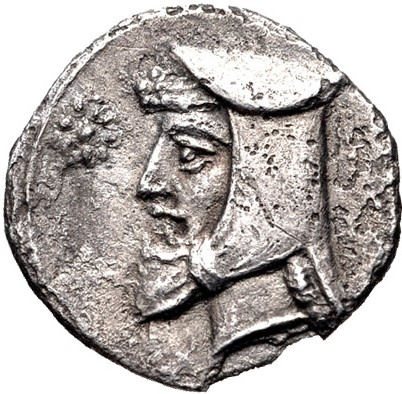
- Possible coin of Mazaeus
- Born: 385 BC
- Died: 328 BC (aged 57 years); Babylon
- Military career
- Allegiance: Achaemenid Empire, Macedonian Empire
- Rank: Satrap of Cilicia (under the Achaemenids); Satrap of Babylon (under Alexander the Great)

Mazaeus or Mazday (Aramaic: 𐡌𐡆𐡃𐡉 MZDY, Greek: Μαζαῖος Mazaios) (died 328 BC) was an Achaemenid Persian noble, satrap (a type of governor) of Cilicia and later satrap of Babylon for the Achaemenid Empire. He retained the satrapy after Babylon was under the rule of Alexander the Great.

== Life ==
Mazaeus was the penultimate Persian satrap (governor) of Cilicia. His successor in Cilicia was Arsames, who was ultimately expelled by Alexander the Great.

At the Battle of Gaugamela, Mazaeus commanded the right flank with the Syrian, Median, Mesopotamian, Parthian, Sacian, Tapurian, Hyrcanian, Sacesinian, Cappadocian, and Armenian cavalry.

As a reward for his recognition of Alexander as the legitimate successor of Darius, Mazaeus was rewarded by being able to retain the satrapy of Babylon, as a Hellenistic satrap. Alexander left a Macedonian, Apollodorus of Amphipolis, as the military commander of the garrison of Babylon, and another as tax-collector. Mazaeus continued minting coins under his name, and later without his name.

The daughter of the Persian king Darius III, Stateira II, was originally betrothed to him, but he died before they could be married. She was eventually married to Alexander.

Waldemar Heckel suggested that the Alexander Sarcophagus might have been dedicated to him.

Mazaeus was replaced as satrap of Babylon by Stamenes.

== Coinage ==
Mazaeus had an abundant coinage, which he minted in Tarsos, Sidon and Babylon. Coinage as Satrap of Cilicia

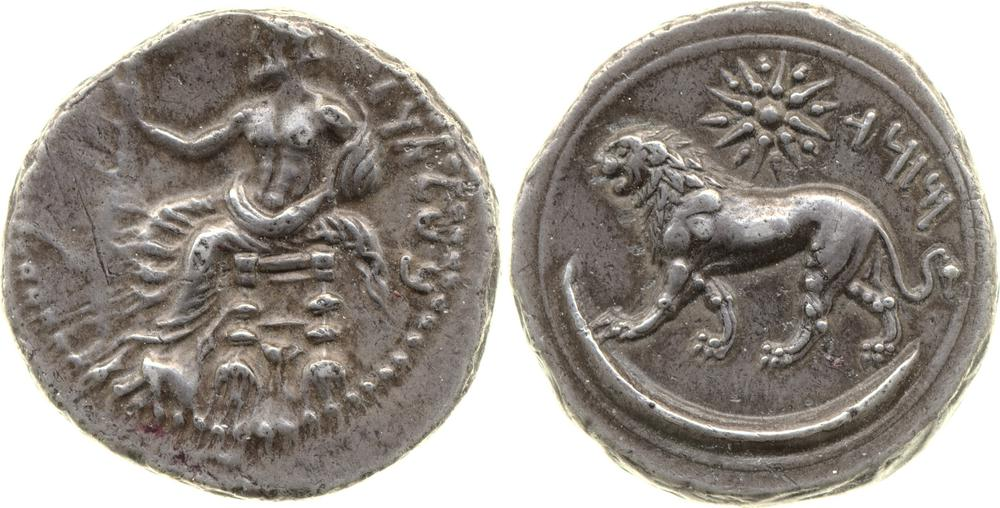
Silver coin of Mazaeus, satrap of Cilicia, minted in Myriandrus, 361–333 BC (circa)

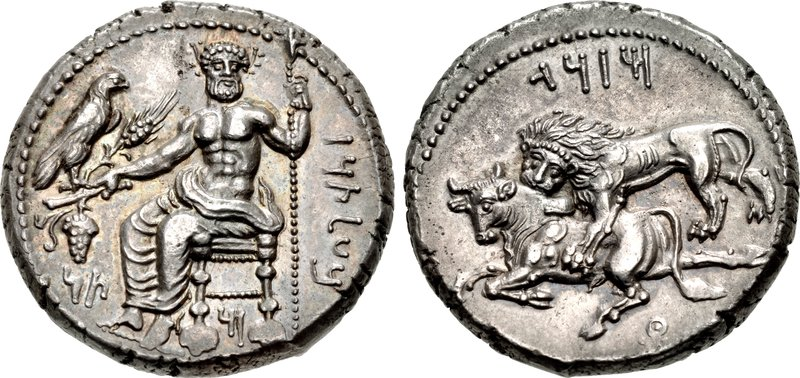
Coin of Mazaios. Satrap of Cilicia, 361/0-334 BC. Tarsos, Cilicia. Aramaic: 𐡌 "M" below throne

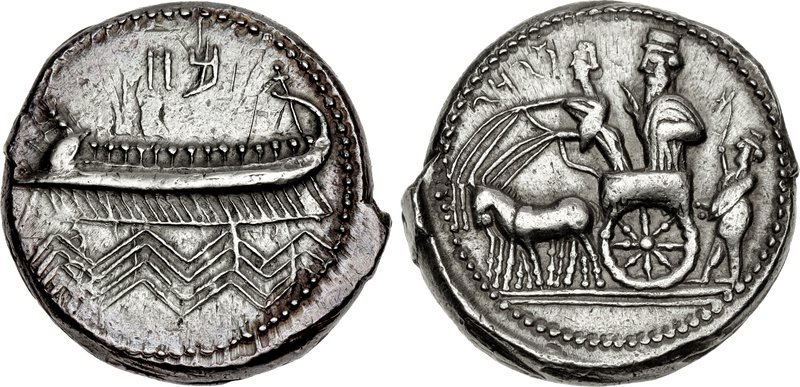
Mazday (Mazaios) as ruler of Sidon. Circa 353–333 BC.

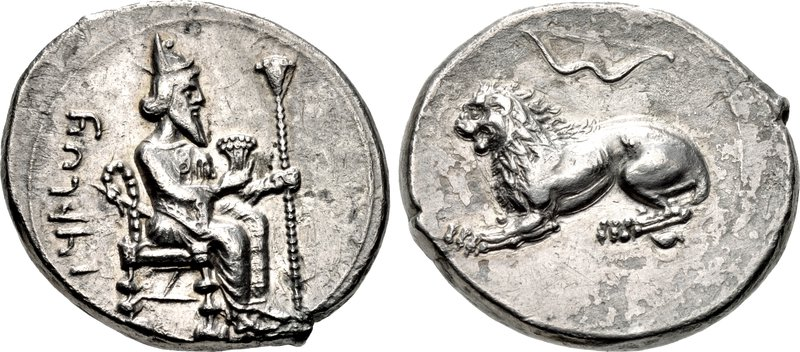
Coin of Mazaios, with Artaxerxes III as Pharaoh. Satrap of Cilicia, 361/0-334 BC. Tarsos, Cilicia.

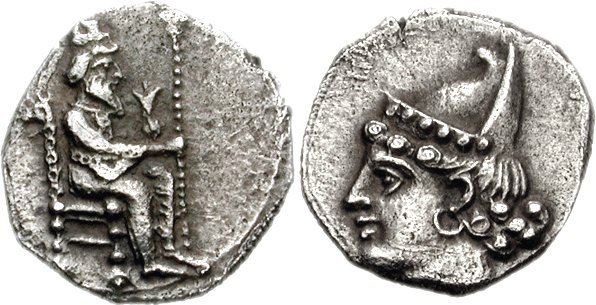
Coin of Mazaios, with Artaxerxes III and possibly Artaxerxes IV as Pharaohs.

Coinage as Satrap of Babylon

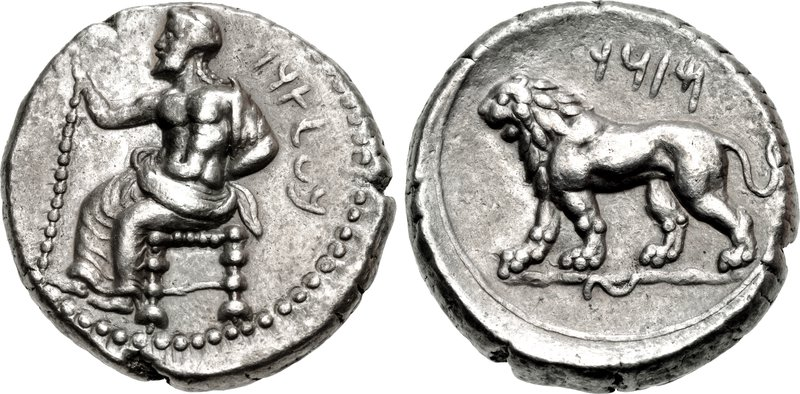
Coinage of Mazaios as Hellenistic Satrap of Babylon, circa 331–328 BC.

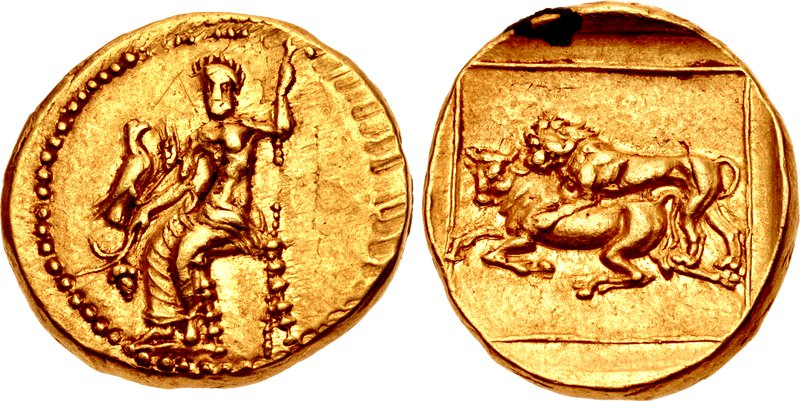
Late coinage of Mazaeus as satrap of Babylon.
