= Sasanian conquest of Egypt =

Medieval Persian military campaign (618–621)

- Part of the Byzantine–Sasanian War of 602–628
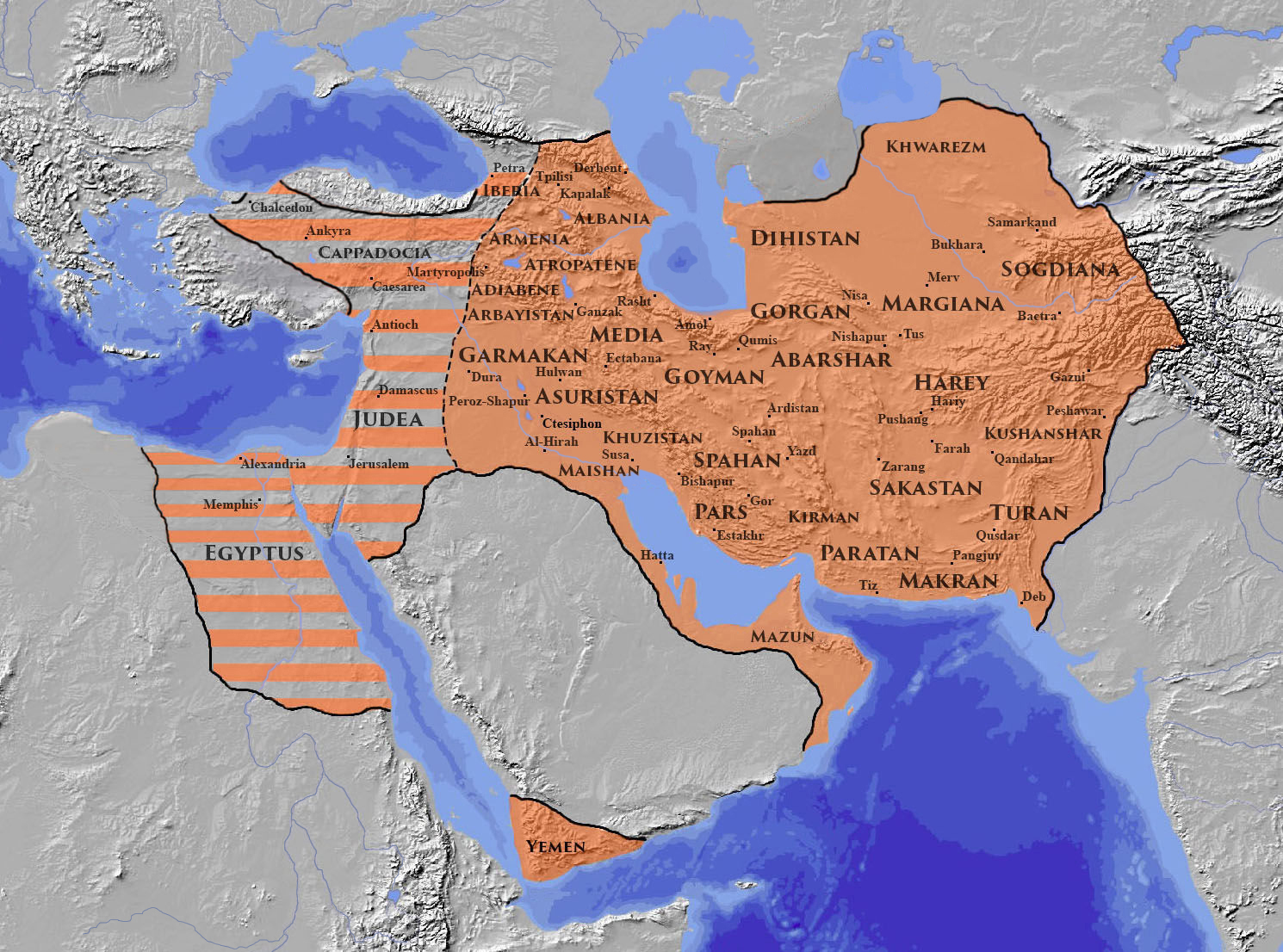
- The Sasanian Empire at its greatest extent under Khosrow II
Date	618–621
Location	Diocese of Egypt
Result	Sasanian victory
Territorial changes	Egypt annexed by the Sasanian Empire

Belligerents
Byzantine Empire	Sasanian Empire

Commanders and leaders
Nicetas	Shahrbaraz

The Sasanian conquest of Egypt took place between 618 and 621 CE, when the Sassanid Empire defeated the Byzantine forces in Egypt and occupied the province. The fall of Alexandria, the capital of Roman Egypt, marked the first and most important stage in the Sasanian campaign to conquer the province, which eventually fell completely under Persian rule within a couple of years.

== Background ==
The Persian shah, Khosrow II, had taken advantage of the internal turmoil of the Byzantine Empire after the overthrow of Emperor Maurice by Phocas to attack the Roman provinces in the East. By 615, the Persians had driven the Romans out of northern Mesopotamia, Syria, and Palestine. Determined to eradicate Roman rule in Asia, Khosrow turned his sights on Egypt, the Eastern Roman Empire's granary.

== Fall of Egypt ==
The Persian invasion of Egypt began either in 617 or 618, but little is known about the details of this campaign, since the province was practically cut off from the remaining Roman territories. The Persian army headed for Alexandria, where Nicetas, Heraclius' cousin and local governor, was unable to offer effective resistance. He and the Chalcedonian patriarch, John V, fled the city to Cyprus. According to the Khuzistan Chronicle, Alexandria was then betrayed to the Persians by a certain Peter in June 619. The Persians also sacked the monastic centre at the Enaton, nine miles west of Alexandria along the coastal road.

After the fall of Alexandria, the Persians gradually extended their rule southwards along the Nile. Sporadic resistance required some mopping-up operations, but by 621, the province was securely in Persian hands.

== Aftermath ==
Egypt would remain in Persian hands for 10 years, ruled by general Shahrbaraz from Alexandria. As the Roman emperor, Heraclius, reversed the tide and defeated Khosrow, Shahrbaraz was ordered to evacuate the province, but refused. In the end, Heraclius, trying both to recover Egypt and to sow disunion amongst the Persians, offered to help Shahrbaraz seize the Persian throne for himself. An agreement was reached and in the summer of 629 the Persian troops began leaving Egypt. An account of the event is given by A. J. Butler.

== See also ==
- Kisra legend, a story of migration of a Persian force from Egypt to Nigeria

== Sources ==
- Dodgeon, Michael H.; Greatrex, Geoffrey; Lieu, Samuel N. C. (2002). The Roman Eastern Frontier and the Persian Wars (Part I, 226–363 AD). Routledge. pp. 196–97. ISBN 0-415-00342-3.
- Frye, R. N. (1993). "The Political History of Iran under the Sassanids". In Yarshater, Ehsan; Bailey, Harold (eds.). The Cambridge History of Iran. Cambridge University Press. ISBN 978-0-521-20092-9.
- Howard-Johnston, James (2006). East Rome, Sasanian Persia And the End of Antiquity: Historiographical And Historical Studies. Ashgate Publishing. ISBN 0-86078-992-6.
- Juckel, Andreas (2011). "The Enaton". In Sebastian P. Brock; Aaron M. Butts; George A. Kiraz; Lucas Van Rompay (eds.). Gorgias Encyclopedic Dictionary of the Syriac Heritage: Electronic Edition. Gorgias Press.
