= Late Period of Egypt =

Period in ancient Egyptian history ( 664 BCE–332 BCE)

- 664 BC–332 BC
- Egypt in the 6th century BC.
- Capital: Sais, Mendes, Sebennytos
- Common languages: Ancient Egyptian
- Religion: Ancient Egyptian religion
- Government: Monarchy
- Pharaoh
  - 664–610 BC: Psamtik I (first)
  - 336–332 BC: Darius III (last)
- History
  - Began: 664 BC
  - Ended: 332 BC
Preceded by	Succeeded by
Third Intermediate Period of Egypt	Macedonian Empire; Ptolemaic Egypt

The Late Period of Egypt refers to ancient Egypt between the 7th century BC and the 4th century BC. It is the final era of traditional pharaonic Egyptian rule. The Late Period was a period of Egyptian reunification, native dynasties, foreign invasions, military resistance, cultural revival, and renewed monumental construction.

Considered the last flowering of native Egyptian rulers after the Third Intermediate Period in the 26th Saite Dynasty founded by Psamtik I, it also includes the time of Achaemenid rule over Egypt after the conquest by Cambyses II from 525 BC until 404 BC, followed by a short period of independence until the conquest of Egypt by Alexander the Great in 332 BC.

The Late Period existed from 664 BC until 332 BC, following a period of foreign rule by the Nubian 25th Dynasty and beginning with a short period of Neo-Assyrian suzerainty, with Psamtik I initially ruling as their vassal. The period ended with the conquests of the Achaemenid Empire by Alexander the Great and the establishment of the Ptolemaic dynasty by his general Ptolemy I Soter, one of the Hellenistic diadochi from Macedon in northern Greece. With the Macedonian Greek conquest in the latter half of the 4th century BC, the age of Ptolemaic Egypt began.

== History ==
=== 26th Dynasty ===
The Twenty-Sixth Dynasty, also known as the Saite Dynasty, after its seat of power the city of Sais, reigned from 672 to 525 BC, and consisted of six pharaohs. It started with the unification of Egypt under Psamtik I in 656/655 BC, itself a direct consequence of the Sack of Thebes by the Assyrians in 663 BC. Canal construction from the Nile to the Red Sea began.

Egypt seems to have expanded into the Near East early in this period. They conquered the city of Ashdod around 655 BC, and a wide range of archaeological finds from throughout the Levant shows an Egyptian occupation and control in the late decades of the 7th century BC. These include various Egyptian objects from several sites, ostraca and documents showing a tribute/tax system, and evidence from the fortress of Mezad Hashavyahu. Egyptian influence reached to the Euphrates area in places such as Kimuhu and Quramati. Later they were pushed back by the defeat at Carcemish, although Egyptian intervention in the Near East seems to have continued for a while after this battle.

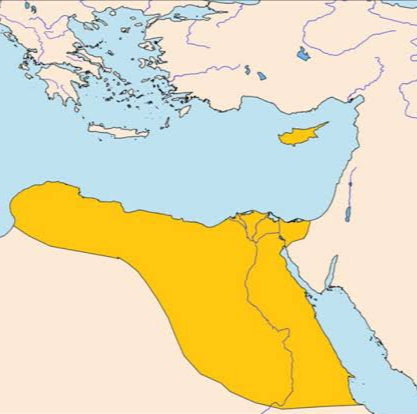
Ancient Egypt under Amasis II

In 570 BC, Apries (Hophra) was deposed by Amasis II, who replaced him as Pharaoh of Egypt. In Amasis' fourth year, around 568–567 BC, Egypt was invaded by the Babylonians, under the leadership of Nebuchadnezzar II. This assault was recorded by a fragmentary Babylonian inscription, as well as a fragmentary stele of Amasis from the 4th year of his reign in 567 BC, which may describe a combined naval and land attack by the Babylonians. Recent evidence suggests that the Babylonians were initially successful during the invasion and gained a foothold in Egypt, but they were repelled by Amasis' forces. It is believed that this forced Nebuchadnezzar II to retire plans to conquer Egypt.

Amasis II followed a new policy and directed his interests toward the Greek world. He annexed Cyprus during his reign. To the south, Psamtik II led a great military expedition that reached deep into upper Nubia and inflicted a heavy defeat on them. A demotic papyrus from the reign of Ahmose II describes a small expedition into Nubia, the character of which is unclear. There is archaeological evidence of an Egyptian garrison at Dorginarti in lower Nubia during the Saite period.

One major contribution from the Late Period of ancient Egypt was the Brooklyn Medical Papyrus. This was a medical papyrus with a collection of medical and magical remedies for victims of snakebites based on snake type or symptoms.

Artwork during this time was representative of animal cults and animal mummies.

=== 27th Dynasty ===
The First Achaemenid Period (525–404 BC) began with the Battle of Pelusium, which saw Egypt (Old Persian: 𐎸𐎭𐎼𐎠𐎹 Mudrāya) conquered by the expansive Achaemenid Empire under Cambyses, and Egypt become a satrapy. The Persians came to dominate Egypt, but Egypt remained independent until it was made a Persian province in 485 B.C., after a revolt. The Twenty-seventh Dynasty of Egypt consists of the Persian emperors - including Cambyses, Xerxes I, and Darius the Great - who ruled Egypt as Pharaohs and governed through their satraps, as well as the Egyptian Petubastis III (522–520 BC) (and possibly the disputed Psammetichus IV), who rebelled in defiance of the Persian authorities. The unsuccessful revolt of Inaros II (460–454), aided by the Athenians as part of the Wars of the Delian League, aspired to the same object. The Persian satraps were Aryandes (525–522 BC; 518–c.496 BC) - whose rule was interrupted by the rebel Pharaoh Petubastis III, Pherendates (c.496–c.486 BC), Achaemenes (c.486–459 BC) - a brother of the emperor Xerxes I, and Arsames (c.454–c.406 BC).

=== 28th–30th Dynasties ===
The Twenty-Eighth Dynasty consisted of a single king, Amyrtaeus, prince of Sais, who successfully rebelled against the Persians, inaugurating Egypt's last significant phase of independence under native sovereigns. He left no monuments with his name. This dynasty reigned for six years, from 404 BC–398 BC.

The Twenty-Ninth Dynasty ruled from Mendes, for the period from 398 to 380 BC. King Hakor of this dynasty was able to defeat a Persian invasion during his reign.

The Thirtieth Dynasty took their art style from the Twenty-Sixth Dynasty. A series of three Pharaohs ruled from 380 to 343 BC. The first king of the dynasty, Nectanebo I, defeated a Persian invasion in 373 BC. His successor, Teos, subsequently led an expedition against the Achaemenid Empire in the Near East. The expedition was beginning to meet with some success, and made its way to Phoenicia without any particular problems. Unfortunately for Teos, his brother, Tjahapimu, was plotting against him. Tjahapimu convinced his son, Nectanebo II, to rebel against Teos and to make himself Pharaoh. The plan was successful and the betrayed Teos had no alternative but to flee, and the expedition disintegrated. The final ruler of this dynasty, and the final native ruler of Egypt, was Nectanebo II who was defeated in battle, leading to the re-annexation of Egypt by the Achaemenid Empire.

=== 31st Dynasty ===
The Second Achaemenid Period saw the re-inclusion of Egypt as a satrapy of the Persian Empire under the rule of the Thirty-First Dynasty, (343–332 BC) which consisted of three Persian emperors who ruled as Pharaoh—Artaxerxes III (343–338 BC), Artaxerxes IV (338–336 BC), and Darius III (336–332 BC)—interrupted by the revolt of the non-Achaemenid Khababash (338–335 BC).

=== 32nd Dynasty ===
Persian rule in Egypt ended with the defeat of the Achaemenid Empire by Alexander the Great, who accepted the surrender of the Persian satrap of Egypt Mazaces in 332 BC. This marked the beginning of Hellenistic rule in Egypt, with Alexander appointing Cleomenes of Naucratis as its overseer (possibly with the title satrap). Cleomenes's oversight lasted until Alexander's death, which was followed after a short interval by the 33rd dynasty, generally known as the Ptolemaic Kingdom.

== See also ==
- Periodization of ancient Egypt
- Dynasties of ancient Egypt
