= Tsenhor =

Tsenhor (fl. circa 525 BC) was an Ancient Egyptian businesswoman living at the end of the 27th dynasty of Egypt.

== Life and career ==
Tsenhor was a businesswoman based in the city of Thebes in Upper Egypt. She was a choachyte, which was a type of funeral undertaker entrepreneur, who was hired to locate and bury mummies (in a new or reused grave), and to organize and perform the funeral rites and ritual ceremonies at the grave prescribed by the next of kin or the will of the dead, for as long as the kin could pay to have them performed (which could be days or years). They were referred to as "water carriers" because water was a frequent part of the rituals that were performed around graves.

Tsenhor had a long and successful career and was, judging from preserved documents, a wealthy businesswoman with her own property. She was married twice, and divided her property in her will for her son from her first marriage and her daughter from her second.Preserved papyri documenting her professional life and assets are kept in several different museums.
