= Cambyses Romance =

Anonymous Sahidic Coptic prose narrative

The Cambyses Romance is an anonymous Sahidic Coptic prose narrative composed no later than the 7th century AD. It is a fictionalized account of the invasion of Egypt by the Persian king Cambyses II in 525 BC that blends various traditions. It is known from a single manuscript, and the beginning and end of the text are lost.

== Synopsis ==
The Romance contains several odd conflations or historical inaccuracies. Cambyses is sometimes called Nebuchadnezzar, deliberately conflating him with Nebuchadnezzar II (604–562 BC), the king of Babylonia who captured Jerusalem. The reigning pharaoh is named Apries (589–570), whose reign corresponds with Nebuchadnezzar's rather than Cambyses'. The historical pharaoh was Psamtik III (526–525). Likewise, the Persians are also called Assyrians, whose kingdom historically was conquered by Nebuchadnezzar's father.

The surviving text begins with Cambyses sending a letter to the people of the land where the sun rises demanding their subjection. He warns them that he is planning to go to war against them if they refuse and that they should not expect effective assistance from the Egyptians. On the advice of Bothor, the people send a letter of rejection to Cambyses, preferring to maintain their alliance with, or perhaps vassalage to, Egypt. From this point onwards in the narrative, Cambyses is sometimes called Nebuchadnezzar.

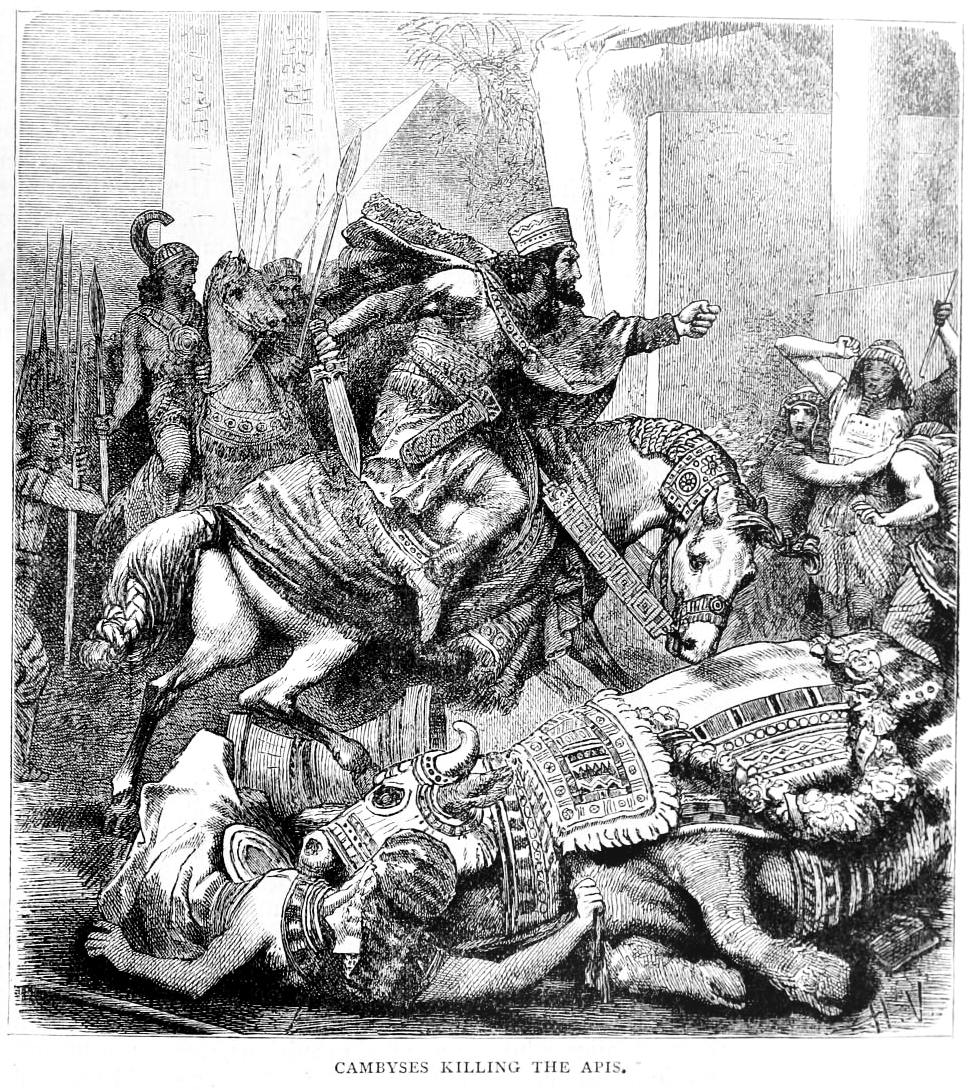
Cambyses killing the Apis bull, from The Illustrated History of the World (1881). This episode is found in Herodotus. The Apis is central to both the Histories and the Romance, although the end of the Apis is not recorded in the surviving Romance.

Agitated, Cambyses calls together his seven counsellors. His own plan is to punish the letter writers directly and so cow Egypt too into submission. One of his counsellors advises that the Egyptians cannot be cowed in this way, since they are the best fighters. He compares them to bears and lions. They can only be defeated by trickery. His plan is to forge a letter in the name of the pharaoh ordering the Egyptians to assemble for a festival in honour of Apis and then fall on them. Cambyses accepts his plan.

Messengers are sent to distribute the forged letter throughout Egypt, but the Egyptians suspect it and their soothsayers confirm their suspicions. Only the Assyrians could have sent it. At this point, with Cambyses preparing his invasion and the Egyptians preparing their defence, the manuscript breaks off. It is impossible to know the length of the complete Romance, since only a middle portion is preserved. The ending of the story is thus left unknown, but Detlef Müller suspects an ahistorical Egyptian victory.

== Dating and authorship ==
The surviving text of the Romance is fragmentary. It is known from six leaves of parchment once part of a larger manuscript. They are in a poor state of preservation and are now parchment P9009 in the Berlin State Museums. The manuscript is of unknown provenance. The beginning and end of the text are lost. The manuscript is undated and palaeographers have dated it variously to as early as the 5th century AD, the 6th–7th centuries or even slightly later, the 8th–9th centuries.

The text of the Romance is thought to have been completed no later than around AD 700, when John of Nikiu completed his Chronicle. The two works relate similar traditions about Cambyses, but neither was the source for the other. The Romance is often thought to have been written in response to either the Persian conquest of Egypt in 619 or the Arab conquest of 641. Eugene Cruz-Uribe argued that it was written later in the 7th century in response to the Arab imposition of jizya. Ludin Jansen argued that the original version was written in Demotic in the 2nd century BC and only much later reworked in Coptic.

Jansen argues that the original author was a Hellenized Egyptian. He denies that he was an Egyptian priest because the text is "devoid of any religious interest whatever". For the same reason, he denies that the redactor was a Copt or a Christian monk. He considers it most likely that the redactor was an Aramaic-speaking Hellenistic Jew. His opinions have not generally been followed. Most scholars have accepted that the author or at least redactor was a Coptic Christian. According to Müller, "the Cambyses Romance as it survived was revised by Christian Egyptians ... a monk of Upper Egypt who probably revised an older original for his own purposes." Leslie MacCoull argues that the author was a Syriac-speaking monk, probably associated with the Monastery of the Syrians in Scetis.

That the author was an Aramaic or Syriac speaker is implied by his use of the nickname sanouth (glossed as 'cowardly') for Cambyses, which is Semitic, not Egyptian.

== Sources and influences ==
Oscar Lemm first proposed that the author of the Romance based his depiction of Cambyses and the Egyptians' martial valour on the Histories of Herodotus, with elements borrowed from the Book of Jeremiah. Besides these, the sources of the Romance include the Antiquities of Josephus, the Book of Judith and native Egyptian traditions as also found in the Apocalypse of Elijah and John of Nikiu. Inspiration may have been drawn from the Alexander Romance.
