= First Achaemenid conquest of Egypt =

Ancient Persian military campaign (525 BC)

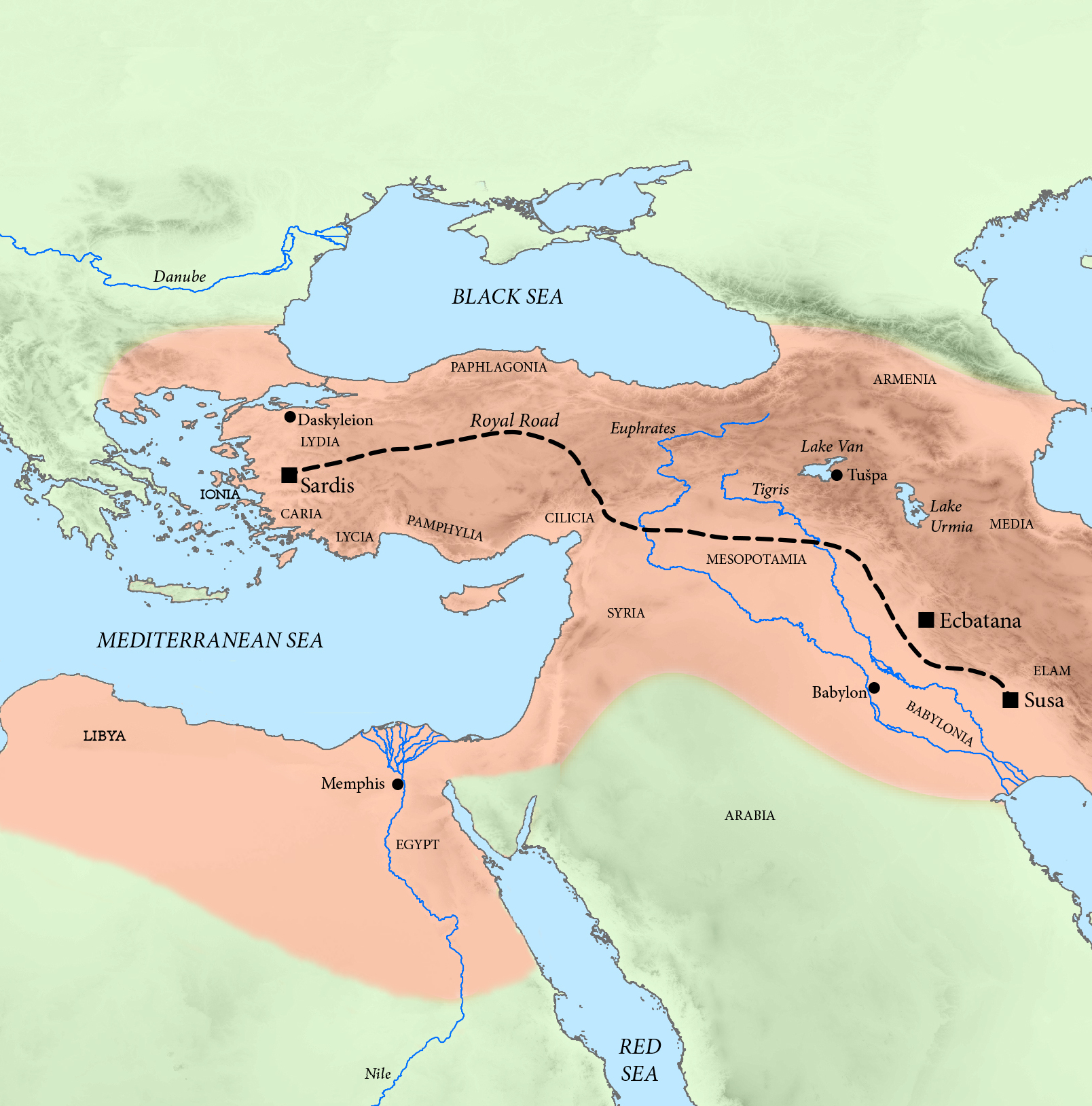
Western part of the Achaemenid Empire, with the territories of Egypt.

The first Achaemenid conquest of Egypt took place in 525 BCE and saw to the foundation of the Twenty-seventh Dynasty of Egypt, also known as the "First Egyptian Satrapy" (Old Persian: Mudrāya). Egypt became a satrapy of the Achaemenid Empire until 404 BC while still maintaining Egyptian royalty customs and positions. The conquest was led by Cambyses II, who defeated the Egyptians at the Battle of Pelusium (525 BCE), and crowned himself pharaoh. Achaemenid rule was disestablished upon the rebellion and crowning of Amyrtaeus as Pharaoh. A second period of Achaemenid rule in Egypt occurred under the Thirty-first Dynasty of Egypt (343–332 BCE).

== Origin of the conflict according to Herodotus ==
Herodotus describes how Pharaoh Amasis II would eventually cause a confrontation with Persia. According to Herodotus, Amasis was asked by Cyrus the Great or Cambyses II for an Egyptian ophthalmologist on good terms. Amasis seems to have complied by forcing an Egyptian physician into mandatory labor, causing him to leave his family behind in Egypt and move to Persia in forced exile. In an attempt to exact revenge for this, the physician grew very close to Cambyses and suggested that Cambyses should ask Amasis for a daughter in marriage in order to solidify his bonds with the Egyptians. Cambyses accepted and requested a daughter of Amasis for marriage.

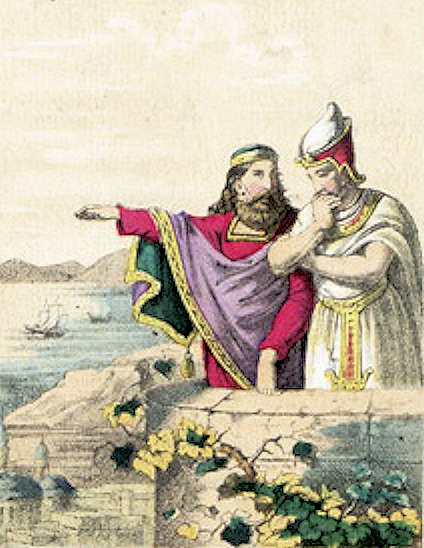
Polycrates, Tyrant of Samos, with Pharaoh Amasis II.

Amasis, worrying that his daughter would be a concubine to the Persian king, refused to give up his offspring; Amasis also was not willing to take on the Persian empire, so he concocted a deception in which he forced the daughter of the ex-pharaoh Apries, whom Herodotus explicitly confirms to have been killed by Amasis, to go to Persia instead of his own offspring.

This daughter of Apries was none other than Nitetis, who was, as per Herodotus's account, "tall and beautiful." Nitetis naturally betrayed Amasis and upon being greeted by the Persian king explained Amasis's trickery and her true origins. This infuriated Cambyses and he vowed to take revenge for it. Amasis died before Cambyses reached him, but his heir and son Psamtik III was defeated by the Persians.

Herodotus also describes how, just like his predecessor, Amasis relied on Greek mercenaries and councilmen. One such figure was Phanes of Halicarnassus, who would later leave Amasis, for reasons that Herodotus does not clearly know, but suspects were personal between the two figures. Amasis sent one of his eunuchs to capture Phanes, but the eunuch was bested by the wise councilman and Phanes fled to Persia, meeting up with Cambyses and providing advice for his invasion of Egypt. Egypt was finally lost to the Persians during the battle of Pelusium in 525 BCE.

== Defeat of Psamtik III at Pelusium ==
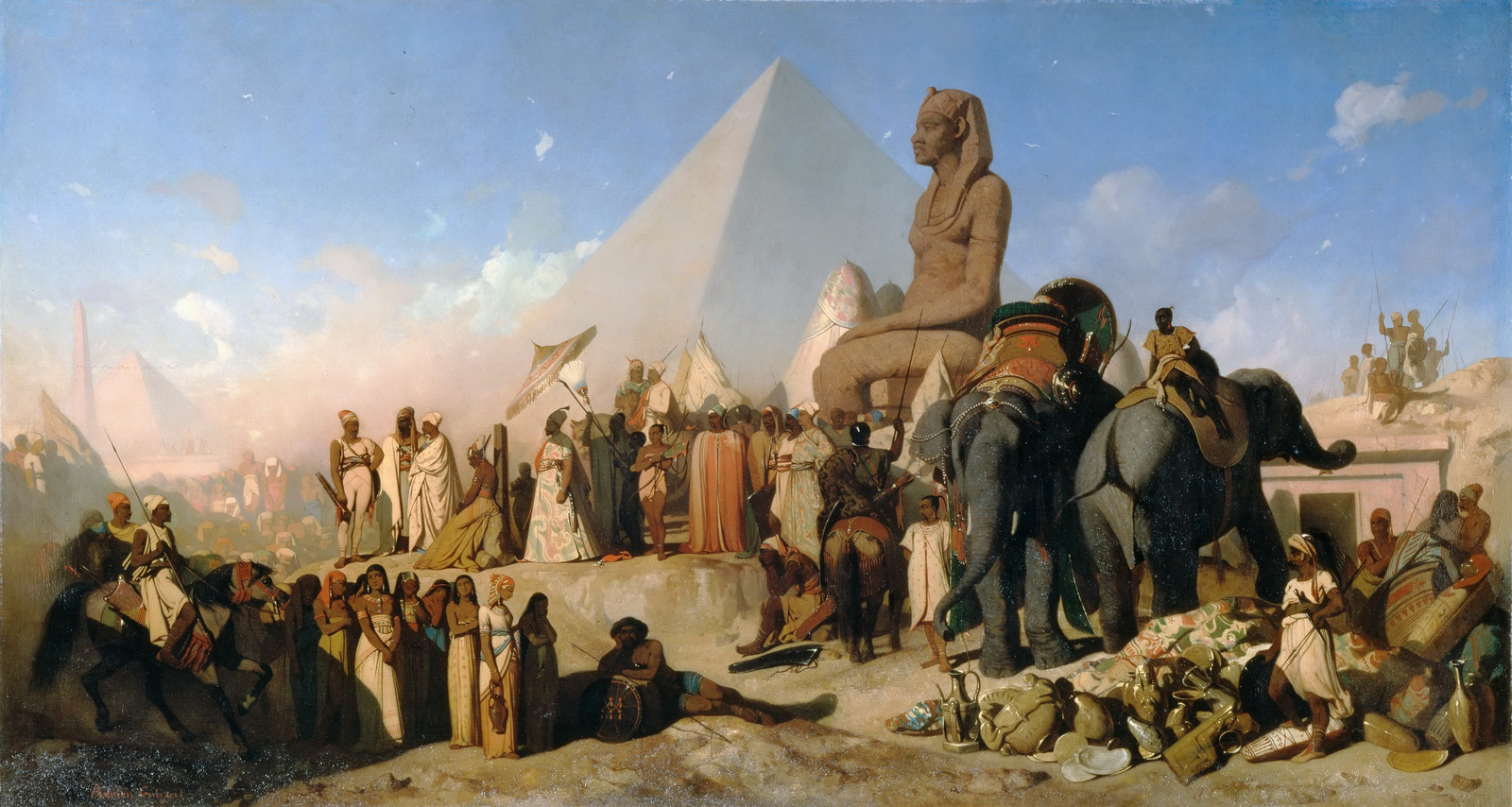
Meeting Between Cambyses II and Psammetichus III, as imaginatively recreated by the French painter Adrien Guignet, after the Battle of Pelusium (525 BCE)

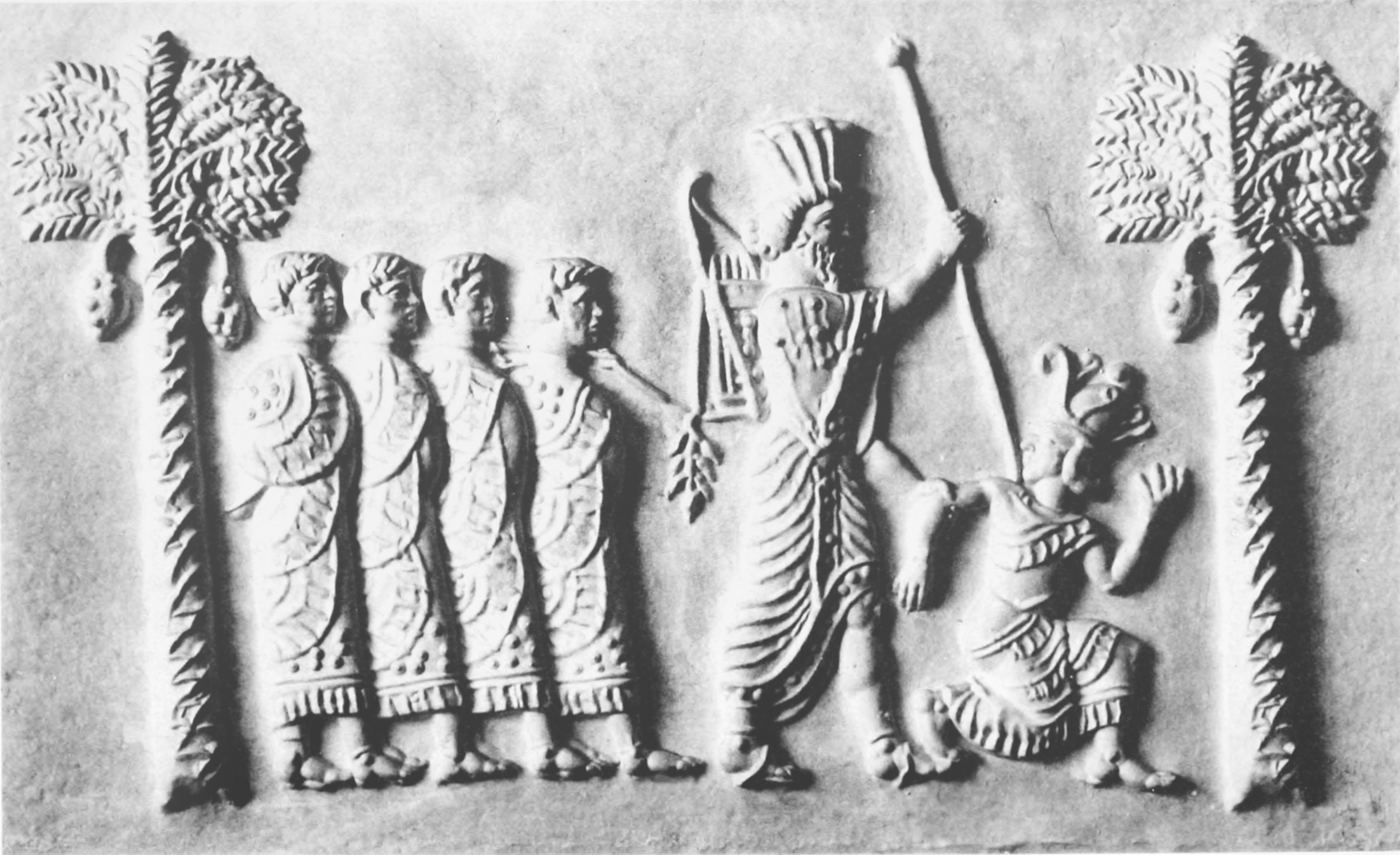
The Svenigorodsky cylinder seal depicting a Persian king thrusting his lance at an Egyptian pharaoh, while holding four captives on a rope.

Amasis II died in 526 BCE, before the Achaemenid invasion, and was succeeded by Psamtik III, who only ruled for six months. A few days after his coronation, rain fell at Thebes, which was a rare event that frightened some Egyptians, who interpreted this as a bad omen. The young and inexperienced pharaoh was no match for the invading Persians. After the Persians under Cambyses had crossed the Sinai desert with the aid of the Arabians, a bitter battle was fought near Pelusium, a city on Egypt's eastern frontier, in the spring of 525 BCE. The Egyptians were defeated at Pelusium and Psamtik was betrayed by one of his allies, Phanes of Halicarnassus. Consequently, Psamtik and his army were compelled to withdraw to Memphis. The Persians captured the city after a long siege, and captured Psamtik after its fall. Shortly thereafter, Cambyses ordered the public execution of two thousand of the principal citizens, including (it is said) a son of the fallen king.

Psamtik's captivity and subsequent execution are described in The Histories by Herodotus, Book III, sections 14 and 15. Psamtik's daughter and the daughters of all the Egyptian noblemen were enslaved. Psamtik's son and two thousand other sons of noblemen were sentenced to death, in retaliation for the murder of the Persian ambassador and the two hundred crew of his boat. An "old man who had once been the king's friend" was reduced to beggary. All these people were brought before Psamtik to test his reaction, and he only became upset after seeing the state of the beggar.

Psamtik's compassion for the beggar caused him to be spared, but his son had already been executed. The deposed pharaoh was then raised up to live in the entourage of the Persian King. After a while, however, Psamtik attempted to raise a rebellion among the Egyptians. When Cambyses learned of this, Psamtik is reported by Herodotus to have drunk bull's blood and immediately died.

Herodotus also relates the desecration of Ahmose II/Amasis' mummy when the Persian king Cambyses conquered Egypt and thus ended the 26th (Saite) Dynasty:

[N]o sooner did [... Cambyses] enter the palace of Amasis that he gave orders for his [Amasis's] body to be taken from the tomb where it lay. This done, he proceeded to have it treated with every possible indignity, such as beating it with whips, sticking it with goads, and plucking its hairs. [... A]s the body had been embalmed and would not fall to pieces under the blows, Cambyses had it burned.

== Plunder: the Sidonian sarcophagi ==
The Egyptian anthropoid sarcophagi of Sidonian kings Eshmunazar II and that of his father Tabnit were manufactured around the time of the Achaemenid conquest of Egypt. Similar Egyptian sarcophagi, with characteristic plump and squarish broad faces, and smooth unarticulated bodies, are known to have been produced in the area of Memphis, during the reigns of Psamtik II (ca. 595–589 BCE) through the reign of Amasis II (570-526 BCE).

Sarcophagus of Eshmunazar II
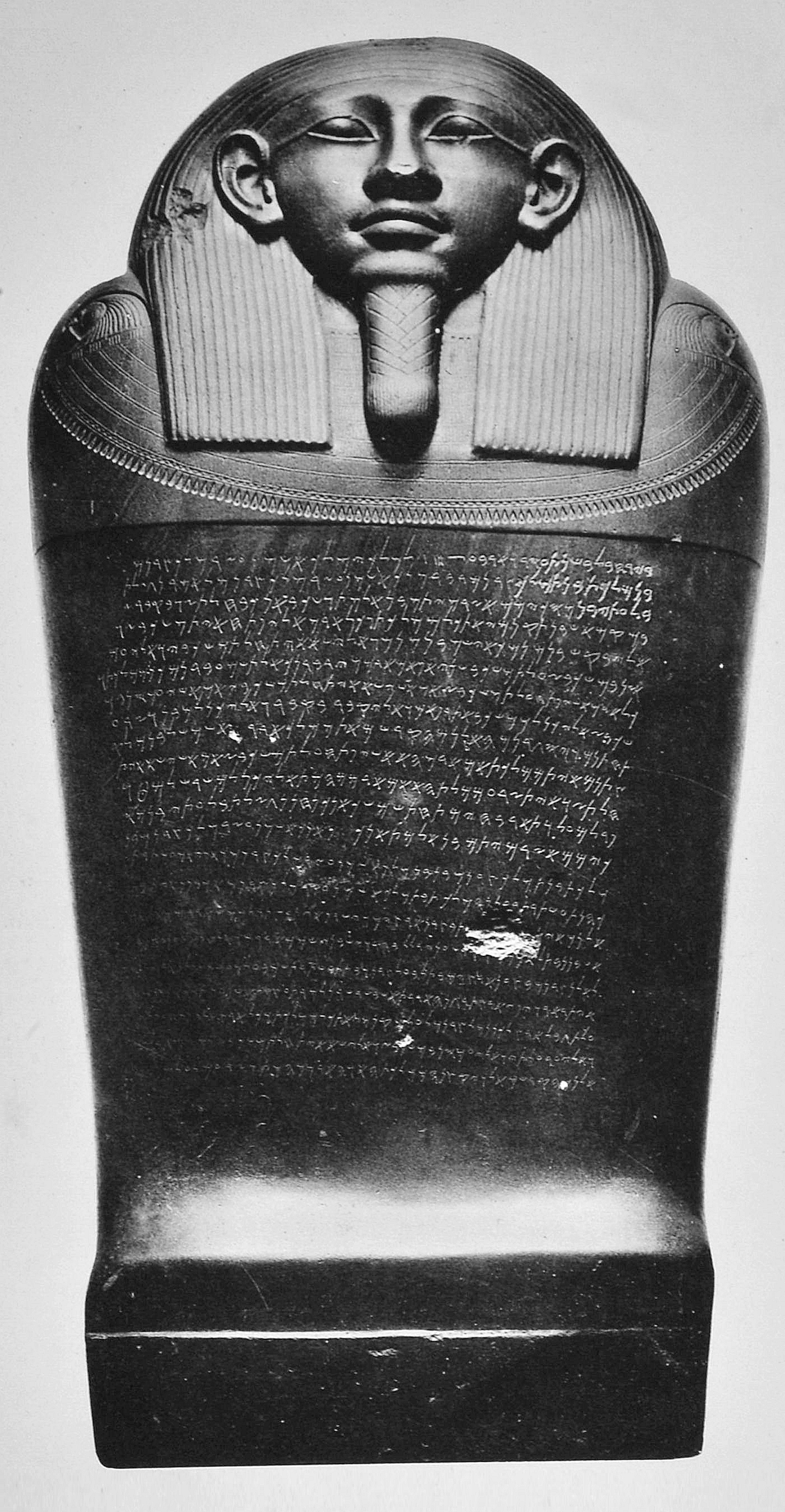
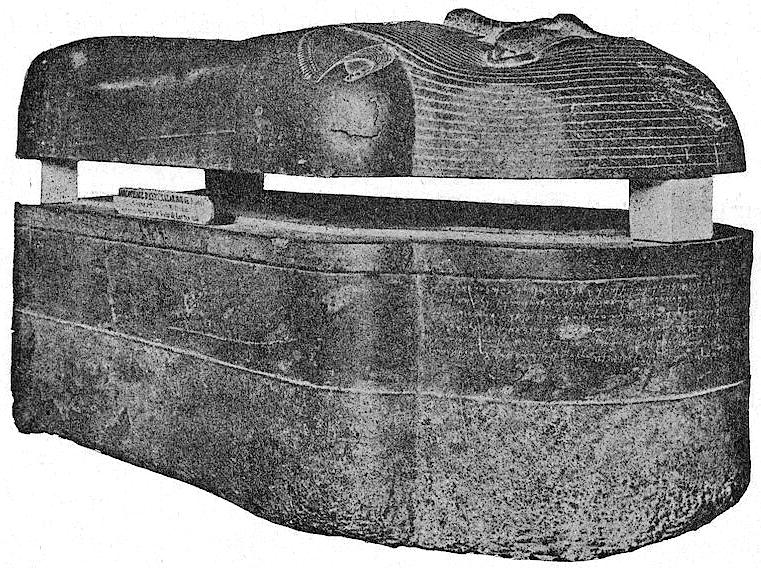
The sarcophagi of the Sidonian kings are thought to have been plundered during the Achaemenid conquest of Egypt, and brought back to Sidon to be reused for royal funerals.

The sarcophagi found in Sidon were originally made in Egypt for members of the Ancient Egyptian elite, but were then transported to Sidon and repurposed for the burial of Sidonian kings. The manufacture of this style of sarcophagi in Egypt ceased around 525 BCE with the fall of the 26th dynasty, therefore Elayi posits that the sarcophagi were seized and brought to Sidon by the Sidonians during their participation in Cambyses II's Achaemenid conquest of Egypt in 525 BCE.

Whereas the Tabnit sarcophagus, belonging to the father of Eshmunazar II, reemployed a sarcophagus already dedicated on its front with a long Egyptian inscription in the name of an Egyptian general, the sarcophagus used for Eshmunazar II was new and was inscribed with a full-length dedication in Phoenician on a clean surface. According to René Dussaud, the new sarcophagus may have been ordered by his surviving mother, Queen Amoashtart, who arranged for the inscription to be made.

The sarcophagi were probably, at least in part, captured as booty by the Sidonian Kings. Herodotus does recount an event in which Cambyses II "ransacked a burial ground at Memphis, where coffins were opened up and the dead bodies they contained were examined", quite possibly providing the occasion on which the sarcophagi were removed and reappropriated by his Sidonian subjects. This is especially the case of the sarcophagus of Tabnit, which was already dedicated to a military man named Penptah and may have been desecrated, whereas the unfinished, not yet dedicated, sarcophagus of Eshmunazar may have been obtained from a Memphis workshop.

These sarcophagi (a third one probably belonged to the Queen Amoashtart), are the only Egyptian sarcophagi that have ever been found outside of Egypt proper.

== Egyptian statue of Darius I ==
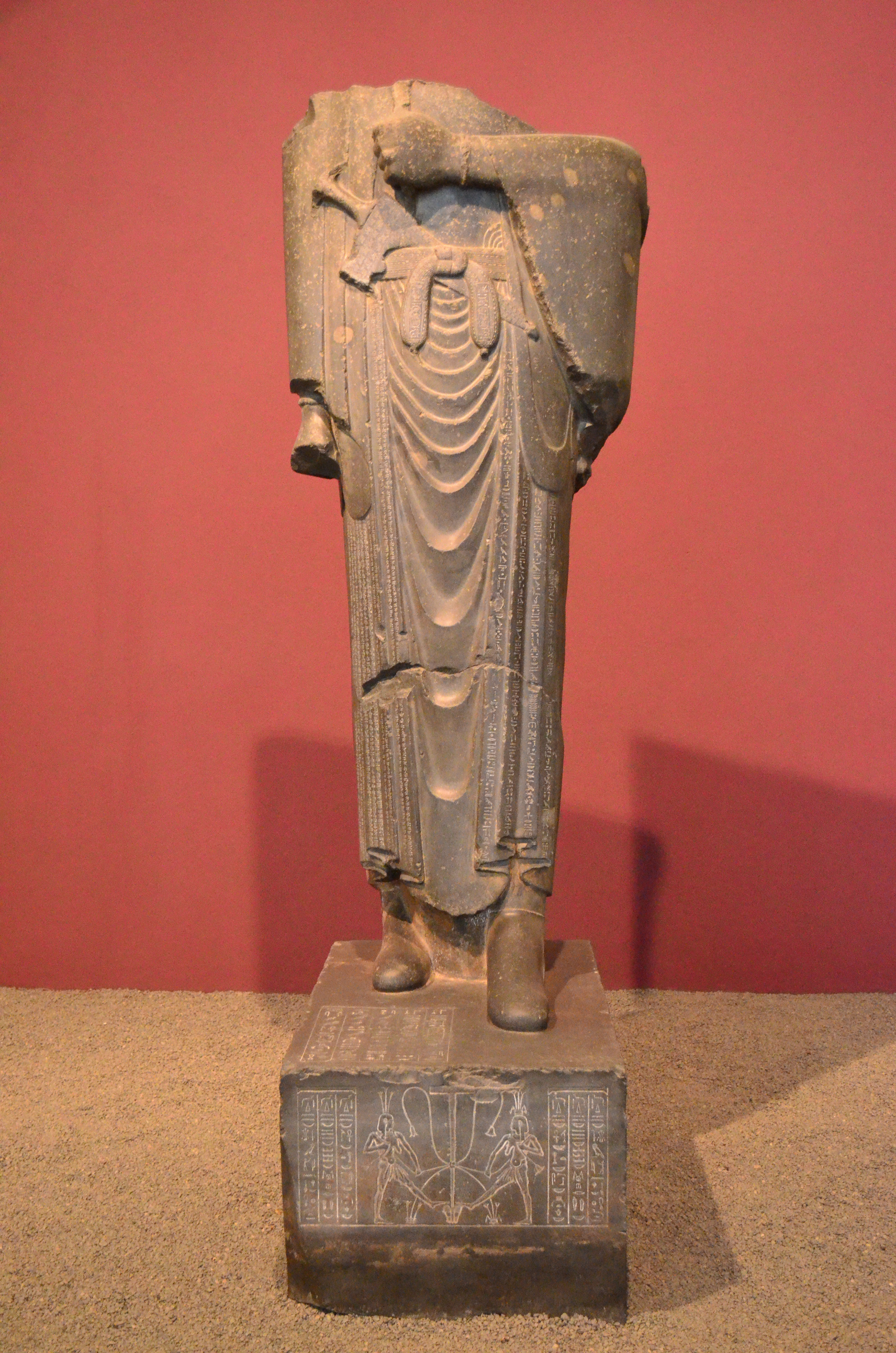
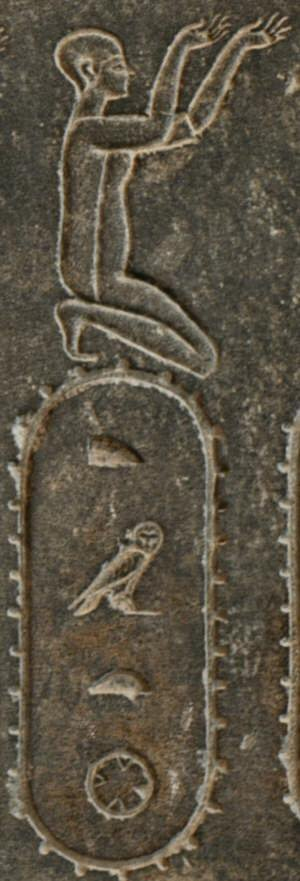
Egyptian statue of Achaemenid Emperor Darius I as Pharaoh of the Twenty-seventh Dynasty of Egypt; 522–486 BCE; greywacke; height: 2.46 m; "Egypt" under the traditional name of Ḳemet (𓈎𓅓𓏏𓊖, "Black Land" ), appears among the subject countries of the Achaemenid Empire, at the bottom of the statue. National Museum of Iran, Teheran.

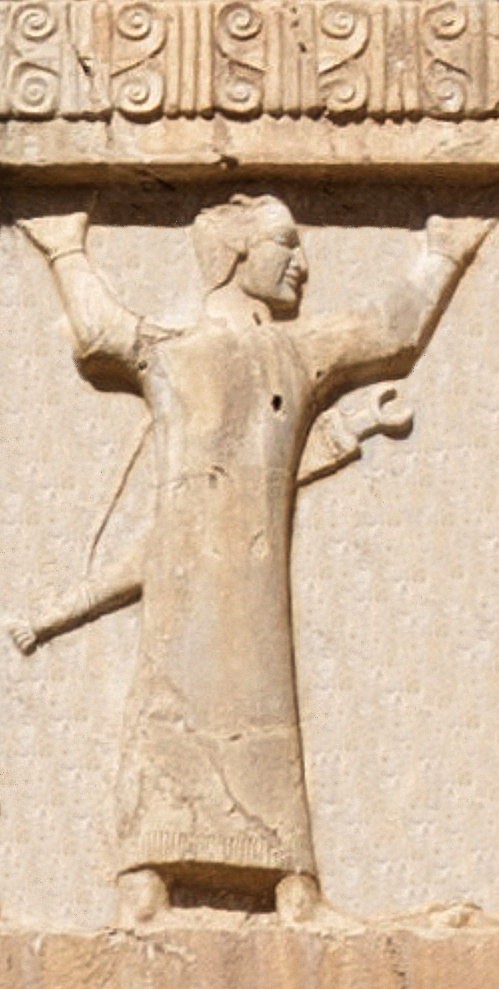
Egyptian soldier of the Achaemenid army, circa 480 BCE, on a relief of the tomb of Xerxes I.

The Egyptian statue of Darius the Great is a statue of Achaemenid ruler Darius I with Egyptian iconography and inscriptions. This is the best known example of in-the-round statuary that has remained from the Achaemenid period. The statue was made in Egypt from grey granite, but was then transported to Susa, possibly by Xerxes I. "Egypt" under the traditional name of Ḳemet (𓈎𓅓𓏏𓊖, "Black Land" ), appears among the subject countries of the Achaemenid Empire, at the bottom of the statue.

== Later literature ==
The Achaemenid conquest was the subject of a late antique Coptic prose fiction, the Cambyses Romance. The text is incomplete, but appears to be based in part on indigenous traditions.

== Sources ==
- Buhl, Marie Louise (1983). The Near Eastern pottery and objects of other materials from the Upper strata. København: Munksgaard. OCLC 886631942.
- Elayi, Josette (2006). "An updated chronology of the reigns of Phoenician kings during the Persian period (539–333 BCE)" (PDF). Digitorient. Collège de France – UMR7912.
- Nitschke, Jessica (2007). Perceptions of Culture: Interpreting Greco-Near Eastern Hybridity in the Phoenician Homeland (PhD thesis). Berkeley: University of California.
- Versluys, Miguel John (2010). "Understanding Egypt In Egypt And Beyond". In Bricault, Laurent (ed.). Isis on the Nile. Egyptian Gods in Hellenistic and Roman Egypt - Proceedings of the IVth International Conference of Isis Studies, Liège, November 27-29, 2008 : Michel Malaise in honorem. Religions in the Graeco-Roman world, 171. Leiden: Brill. pp. 7–36. doi:10.1163/EJ.9789004188822.I-364.10. ISBN 9789004210868. S2CID 56027286.
