= Egyptian statue of Darius the Great =

Statue from the Achaemenid Empire

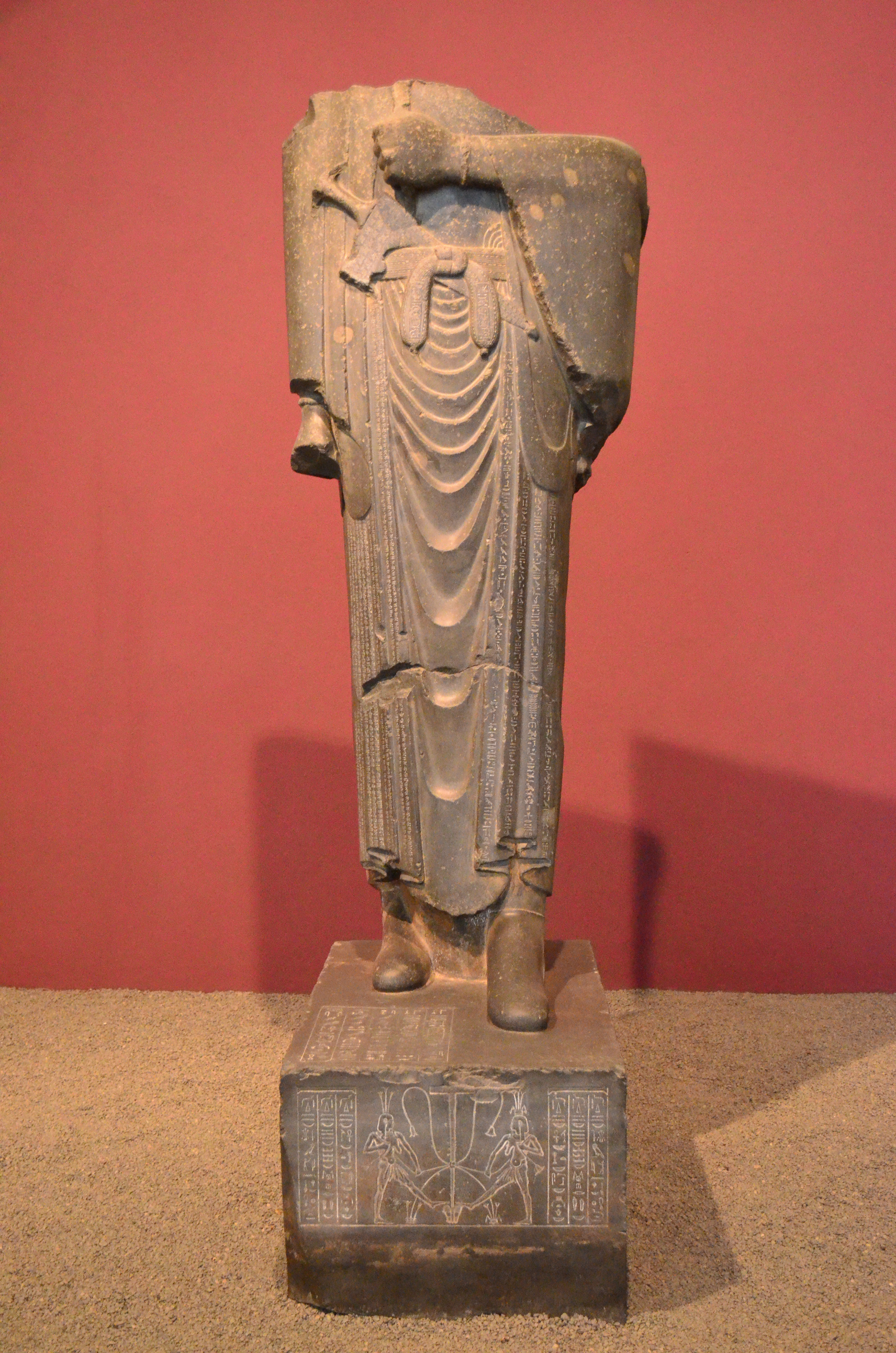
- Statue of Achaemenid king Darius the Great as Pharaoh of the Twenty-seventh Dynasty of Egypt; 522–486 BCE; greywacke; height: 2.46 m; National Museum of Iran in Tehran
- Material: Grey granite from the Wadi Hammamat, eastern Egypt
- Size: 2.46 m high
- Created: 522-486 BC
- Discovered: Susa (Iran), in 1972
- Present location: National Museum of Iran

The Egyptian statue of Darius the Great is one of the main surviving works from the Achaemenid Empire, housed at National Museum of Iran. It depicts the Achaemenid king Darius the Great with Egyptian iconography and inscriptions. It is the best known example of in-the-round statuary that has remained from the Achaemenid Empire.

The style of the statue is a combination of Egyptian (e.g. the base and the back pillar) and Persian (e.g. the figure).

Darius is depicted wearing a Persian dress, and armed with a dagger at his belt. The pleats of the right side of the robe are inscribed in Old Persian, Elamite and Babylonian cuneiform. The other side of the robe is inscribed with hieroglyphs. According to these inscriptions, the statue was made in Egypt at the request of Darius. This would have followed the Achaemenid conquest of Egypt. The statue was later brought to Susa by Darius' son, Xerxes I.

The base of the statue is in Egyptian style. The front and back has a depiction of Hapi, the Egyptian god of the Nile. The sides represent rows of vassals from numerous countries, with a total of twenty-four cartouches. The statue is of grey granite that chemical analysis has indicated comes from the Wadi Hammamat in eastern Egypt.

After excavating the surrounding areas and still not finding its head, experts concluded that when Alexander the Great invaded in 330 BC, he (or his soldiers) attempted to destroy the statue. But due to its immense weight, they were unable to topple it, so they broke its head and struck the statue with their sword. A major reason that reinforces this conclusion is the presence of multiple sword marks identified on the statue, which remain clearly visible.

== Inscriptions ==
The statue contains four inscriptions in Old Persian, Elamite, and Babylonian:

1- "This is the statue, made of stone, which Darius ordered to be made in Egypt. This is how everyone who will see this in the future, will know that Iranians own Egypt."

2- "A great god is Ahuramazda, who created this earth, who created yonder sky, who created man, who created happiness for man, and who made Darius king."

3- "I am Darius, the great king, king of kings, king of all peoples, king in this great earth far and wide, the son of Hystaspes, an Achaemenid. May Ahuramazda protect me and what I did."

4- "Atum, the god of Heliopolis, has chosen him [Darius] to be the lord of all those who are surrounded by the sun's rays, because he knows that he [Darius] is his [Atum] son. Neith, the goddess of Sais, also chose Darius to become the Lord of the world."

== Details ==
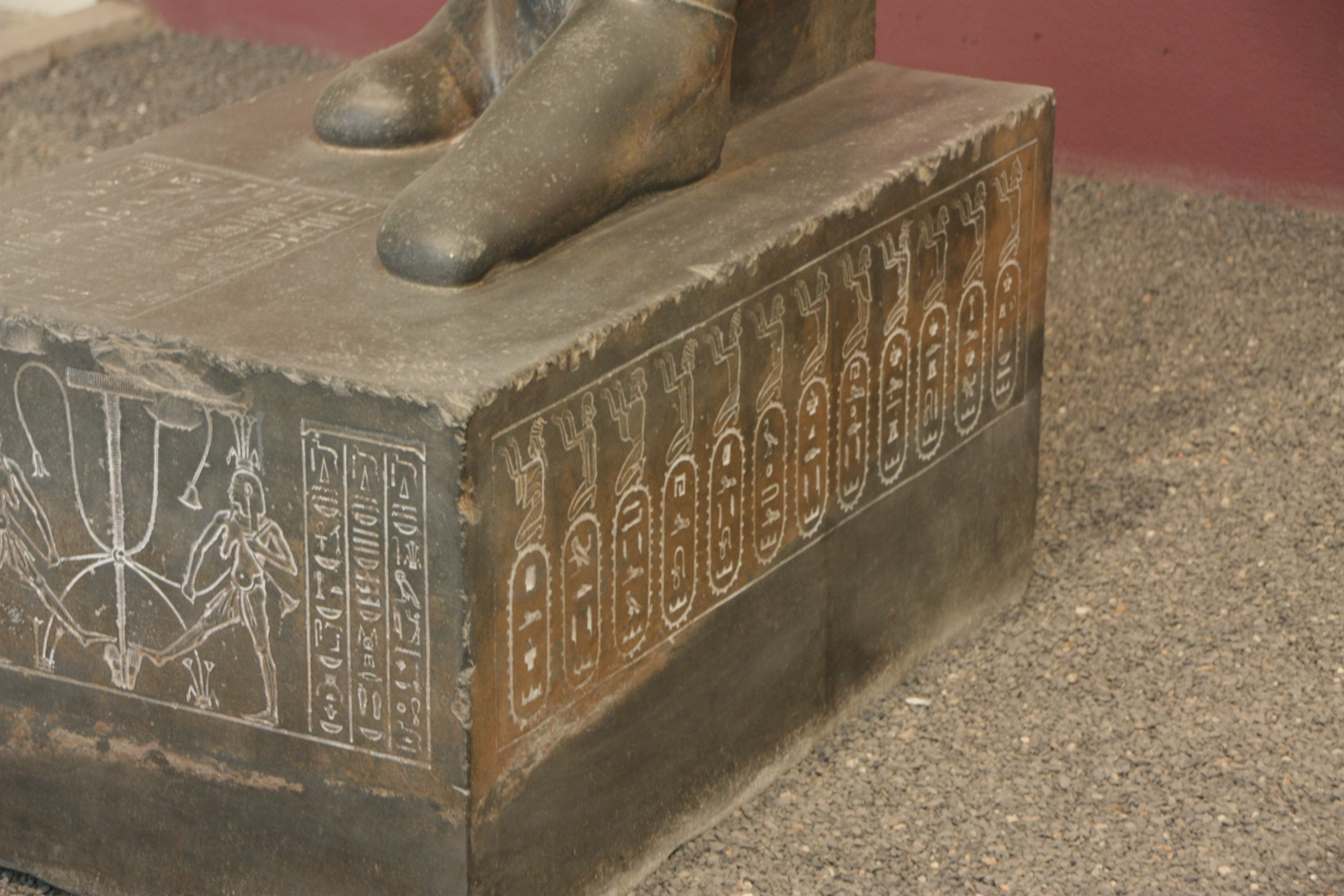
Detail of the base.

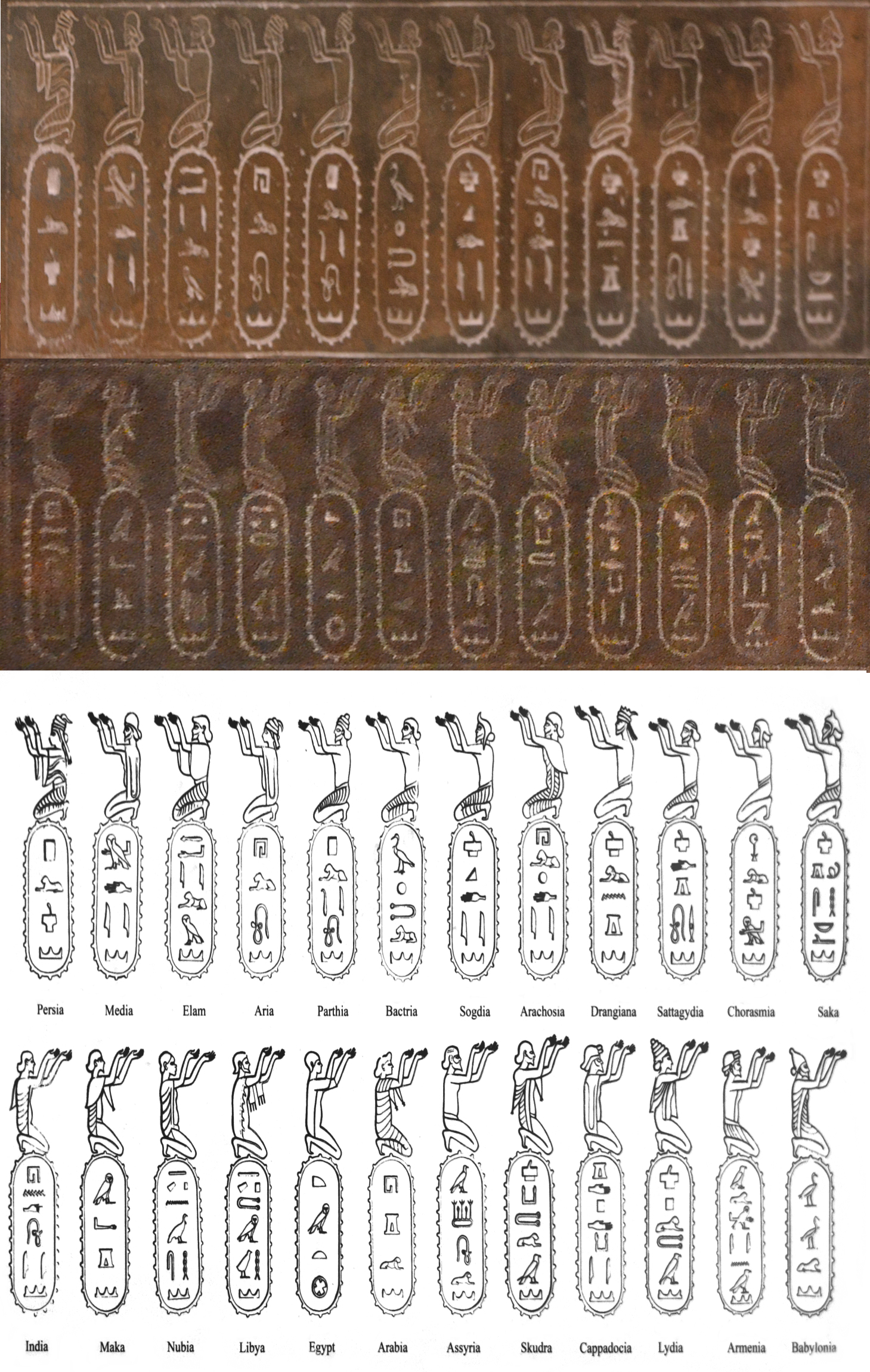
List of subject countries on the base of the statue.

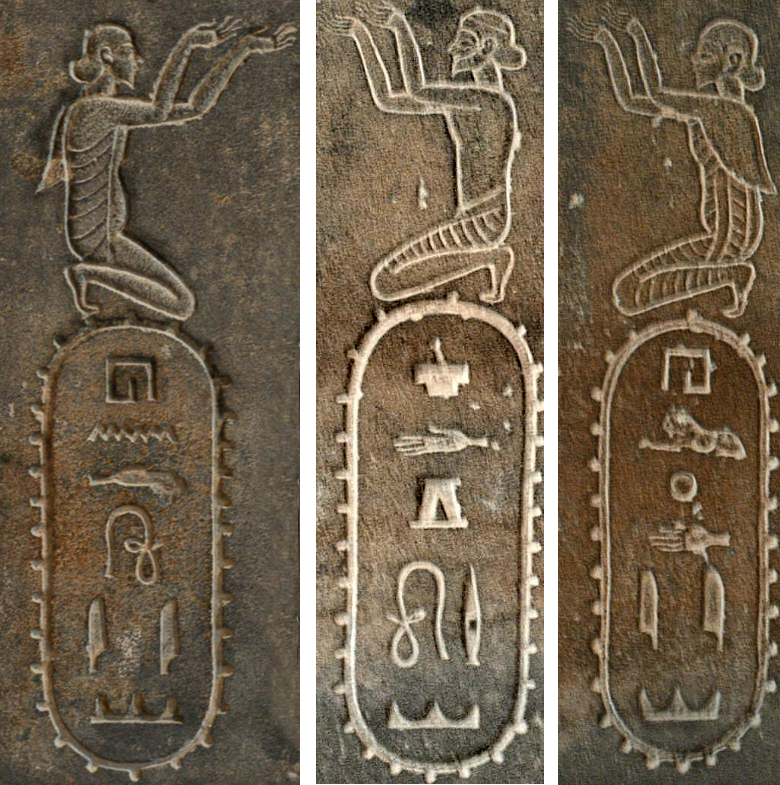
Territories of India, Sattagydia and Arachosia on the statue.
