= Aryandes =

Persian satrap of Egypt between 525 BCE and 496 BCE

- Satrap of Egypt
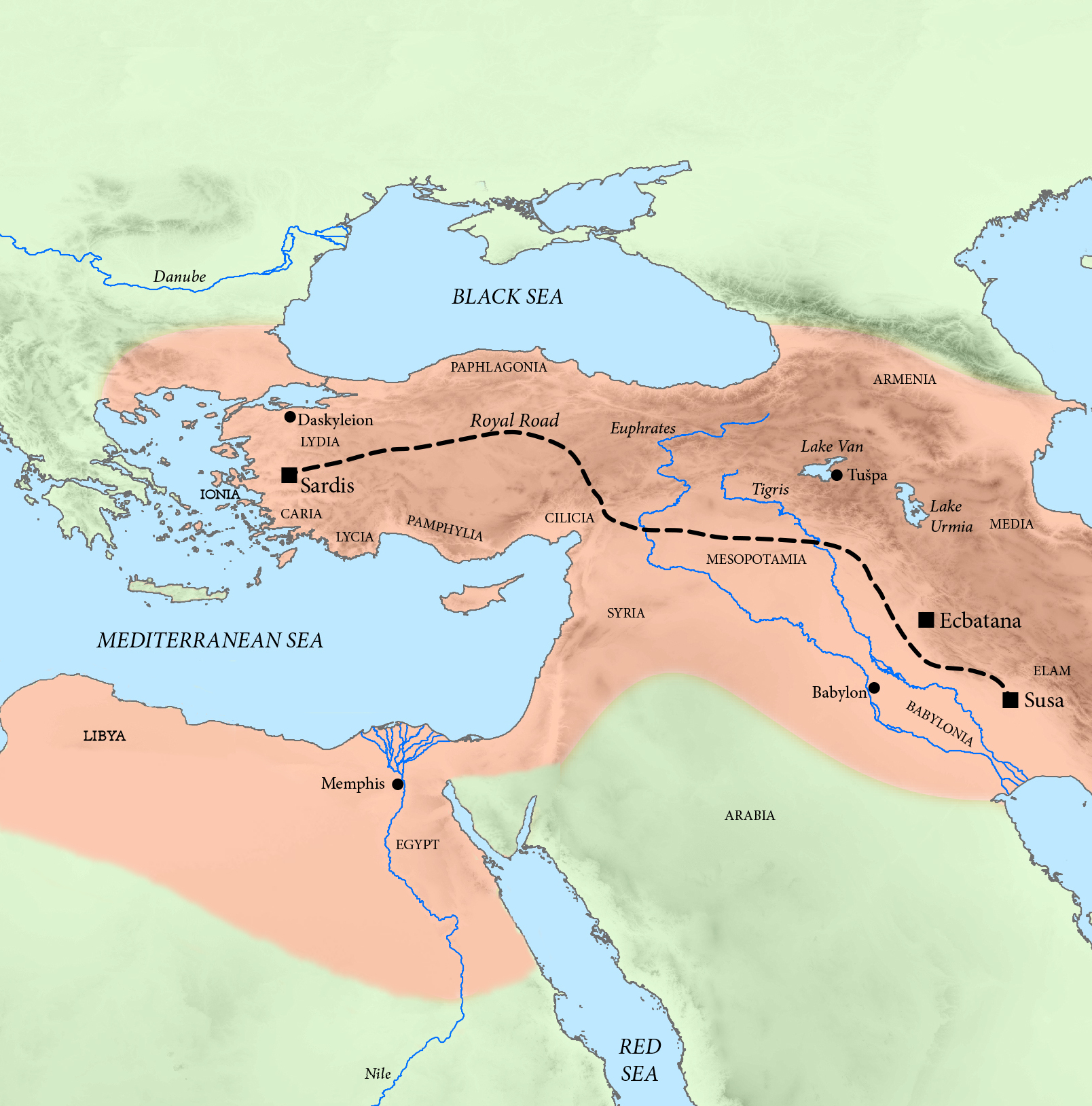
- Aryandes was the first satrap of the Achaemenid Province of Egypt.
- Predecessor: new office
- Successor: Pherendates
- Dynasty: 27th Dynasty
- Pharaoh: Cambyses II to Darius I

Aryandes (Old Iranian: Aryavanda or Arvanta, Ancient Greek: Ἀρυάνδης) was the first Achaemenid satrap of ancient Egypt between 525 BCE and 496 BCE, during the early 27th Dynasty of Egypt.

== Career ==
When king Cambyses II defeated pharaoh Psamtik III at the battle of Pelusium (525 BCE), Egypt became a satrapy of the Achaemenid empire, and Aryandes was appointed satrap shortly after. In 522 BCE, Aryandes was overthrown in a revolt against the Achaemenid rule led by a native Egyptian pharaoh, Petubastis III. The rebellion was personally quelled by the new king Darius I during his expedition to Egypt in 518 BCE, and Aryandes was reinstated. The satrap then attempted to subjugate Libya with poor results.

Around 496 BCE, Aryandes fell out of favour with Darius I and was deposed and replaced by Pherendates. The reason for this decision is unknown, with Herodotus and later Polyaenus claiming that the satrap started minting his own silver coinage, calling it aryandic in opposition to the golden, already existing, daric, thus irritating the Persian king. This story is now considered unlikely because no aryandic has yet been found. It appears more likely that Darius had real concerns that Aryandes would declare independence for his satrapy.

Aryandes had been made governor of Egypt by Cambyses, later he was executed by Darius for making himself equal to the king. When he learned that Darius intended to leave a memorial surpassing anything other kings had left, Aryandes did likewise and was punished for it. The coins struck by Darius were of extremely pure gold and Aryandes, who was ruling Egypt, made silver coins, and no silver money was as pure as that of Aryandes. When Darius heard of this, he had Aryandes executed for rebellion, but not for striking coins.

— Herodotus, Histories IV, 166

New title	Satrap of Egypt c.525 – 522 BCE; 518 – c.496 BCE	Succeeded by Pherendates
