= Arsames (satrap of Egypt) =

5th-century BC Persian satrap of Egypt

- Satrap of Egypt
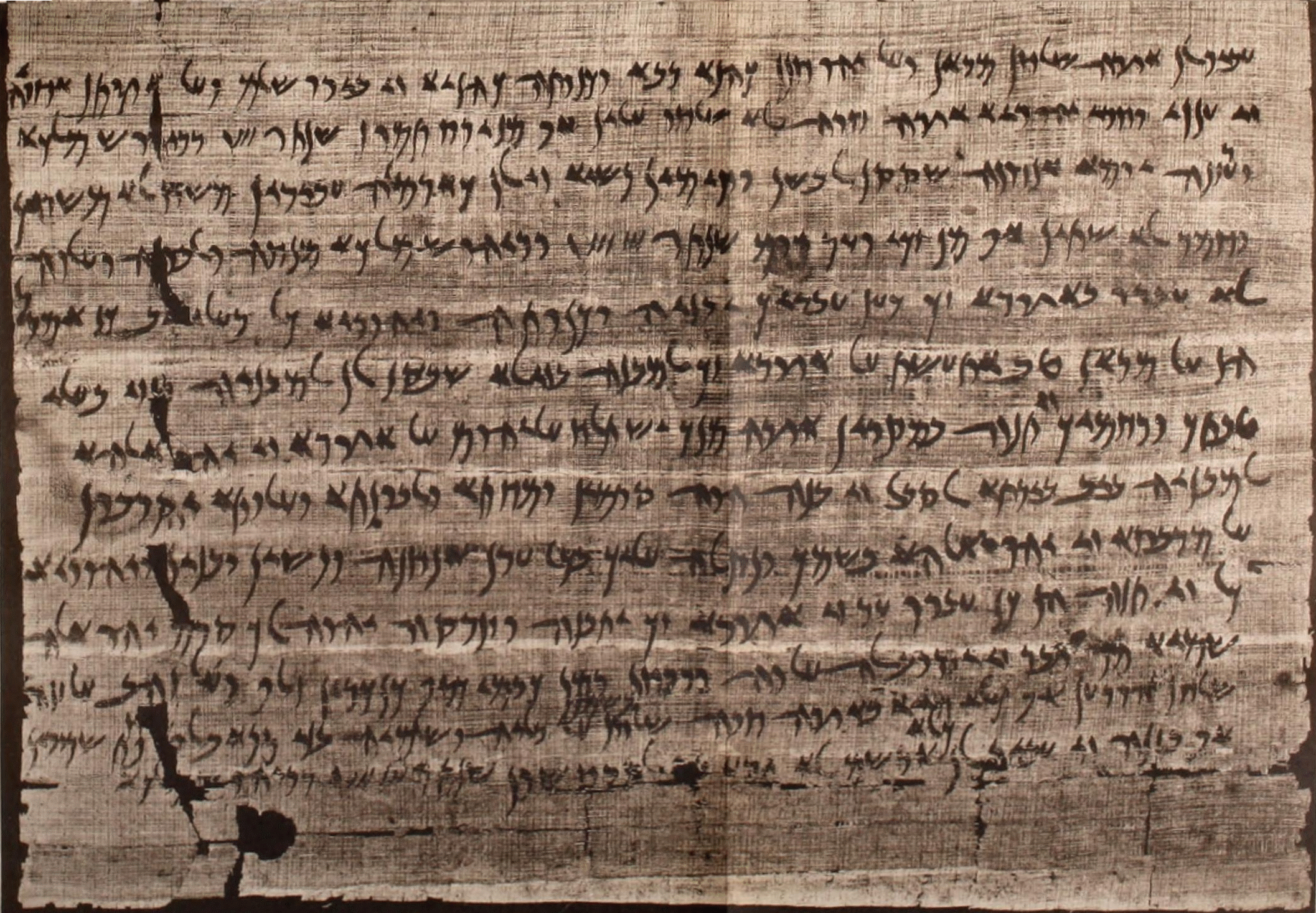
- Lower half of one of the Elephantine papyri, containing a plea for the reconstruction of the Jewish temple at Elephantine, and dated to "..the Year 17 of King Darius (II), under Arsames..." (407 BCE).
- Predecessor: Achaemenes
- Successor: possibly none (end of the satrapy of Egypt)
- Dynasty: 27th Dynasty
- Pharaoh: Artaxerxes I to Darius II

Arsames (also called Sarsamas and Arxanes, from Old Persian Aršāma) was an Achaemenid satrap of ancient Egypt during the 5th century BC, at the time of the 27th Dynasty of Egypt.

== Name ==
"Arsames" is the Hellenized form of the Old Persian name Aršāma (Note: Also spelled Ṛšāma-.) ("having a hero's strength"), which was a common name within the Persian Achaemenid family as well as amongst the Persian elite of the Achaemenid Empire (550–330 BC). The name is a compound, composed of aršan ("male, hero") and ama ("strength"). (Note: The compound words are spelled šršan- and ama- respectively if the spelling Ṛšāma- is used.) The name is attested in Aramaic as ʾršm. The feminine form of the name, *Aršāmā (Greek Arsamē), is attested in the daughter of Darius the Great (522–486 BC).

== Career ==
Arsames was an Achaemenid prince, a grandson of Darius the Great. According to Ctesias, Sarsamas was appointed satrap by general Megabyzus. Previously, an ancient Egyptian prince called Inaros openly revolted against Artaxerxes I and the Achaemenid rule and had slain in battle the satrap, Achaemenes. In 454 BC, shortly after his appointment, Arsames helped suppress the revolt by defeating Athenian reinforcements sent in the Nile Delta.
After the revolt, Arsames undertook a conciliatory policy towards the native Egyptians in order to avoid igniting new revolts; likely for this reason, he allowed Inaros' son Thannyras to maintain his lordship on part of the Delta, as Herodotus reports.

While his aforementioned early career is reported only by Greek sources, Arsames' later life is known from several letters written in Aramaic, mainly compiled by the Jewish priesthood of Elephantine and belonging to the Elephantine papyri, and which are datable from 428 BC onwards. It is known that in 423 BC he supported Darius II in his successful coup d'état, and later he was called back to Susa in Persia between 410 and 407/6 as reported by other documents, among these some exchange letters with his estate manager Nakhtihor and with a man named Artavant who probably acted as satrap of Egypt ad interim.

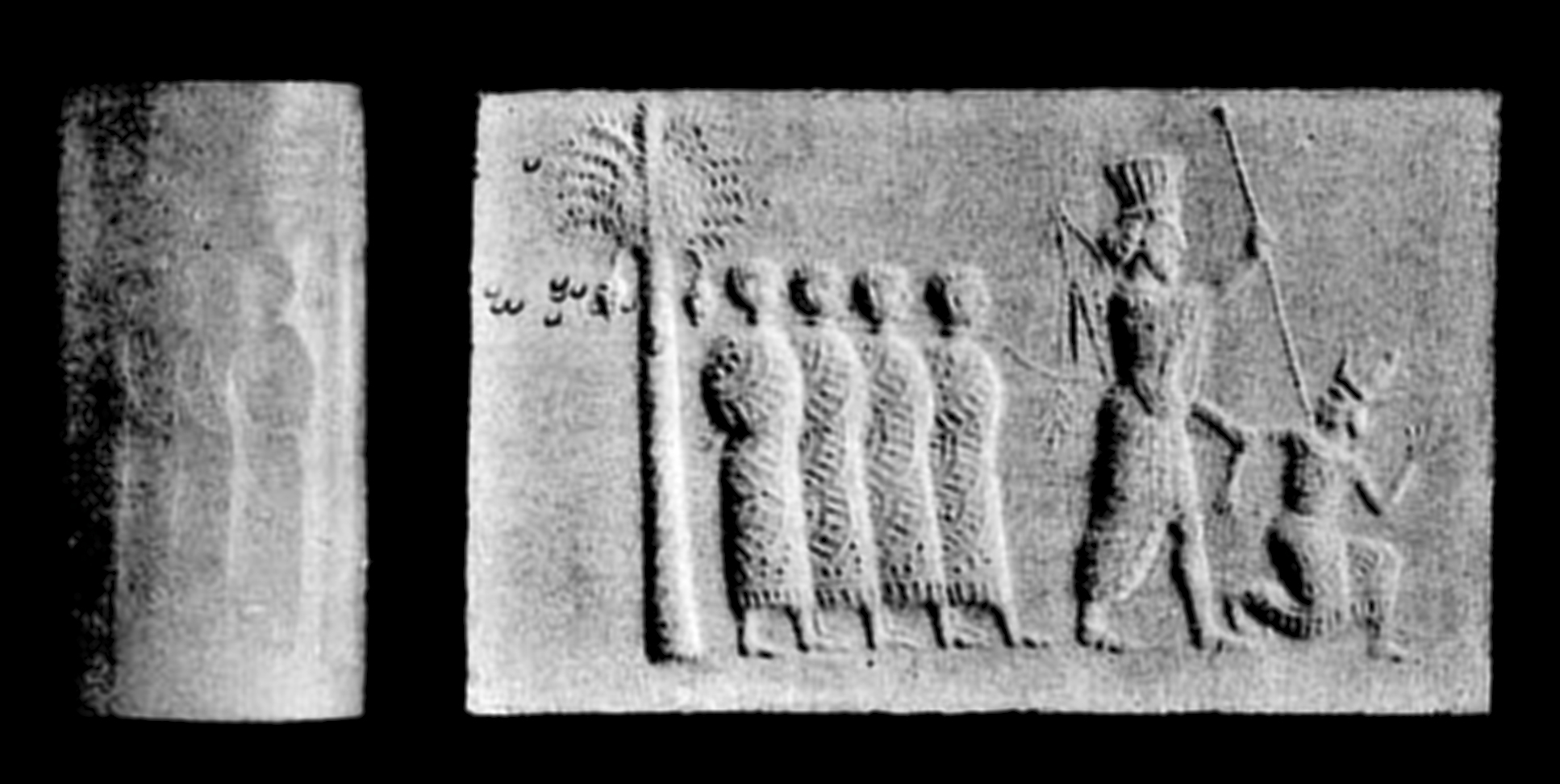
Cylinder seal depicting a Persian king thrusting his lance at an Egyptian pharaoh, while holding four other Egyptian captives on a rope.

In 410 BCE a revolt erupted at Elephantine, where an established Jewish community lived along with the native Egyptians, and where the two communities had their local temple, that of Yahu and Khnum respectively. Jews were well tolerated by Arsames and by the Persian occupants in general; however, it seems that the Jewish practice of sacrificing goats to their god was perceived as an insult by the clergy of the neighbouring temple of the Egyptian ram-headed deity Khnum. Taking advantage of one of Arsames' absences, the clergy of Khnum corrupted a local military commander, Vidaranag, and unimpededly instigated and succeeded into the destruction of the temple of Yahu. Upon his return, Arsames punished the perpetrators, but he felt himself compelled to avoid any controversy by prohibiting the ritual slaughter of goats. However, the multiple pleas by the Elephantine Jews for the reconstruction of their temple seem to have remained unheard for some years by the notables in Judah and Jerusalem to whom they had written.

Arsames is no longer mentioned after 406 BC, and it is likely that he died shortly before the Egyptian reconquest of Egypt achieved by the native pharaoh Amyrtaios in 404 BC.

== Seal of Arsames ==
Arsames is also known from an engraved cylinder seal, in which he is seen killing Saka enemies, with a depiction of the crowns of Lower and Upper Egypt, worn by falcons.

== Notes ==
Preceded by Achaemenes	Satrap of Egypt c.454 – c.406 BC	Succeeded by possibly none (end of the satrapy)
