= Pherendates =

Early 5th century BCE Achaemenid satrap of Egypt

- Satrap of Egypt
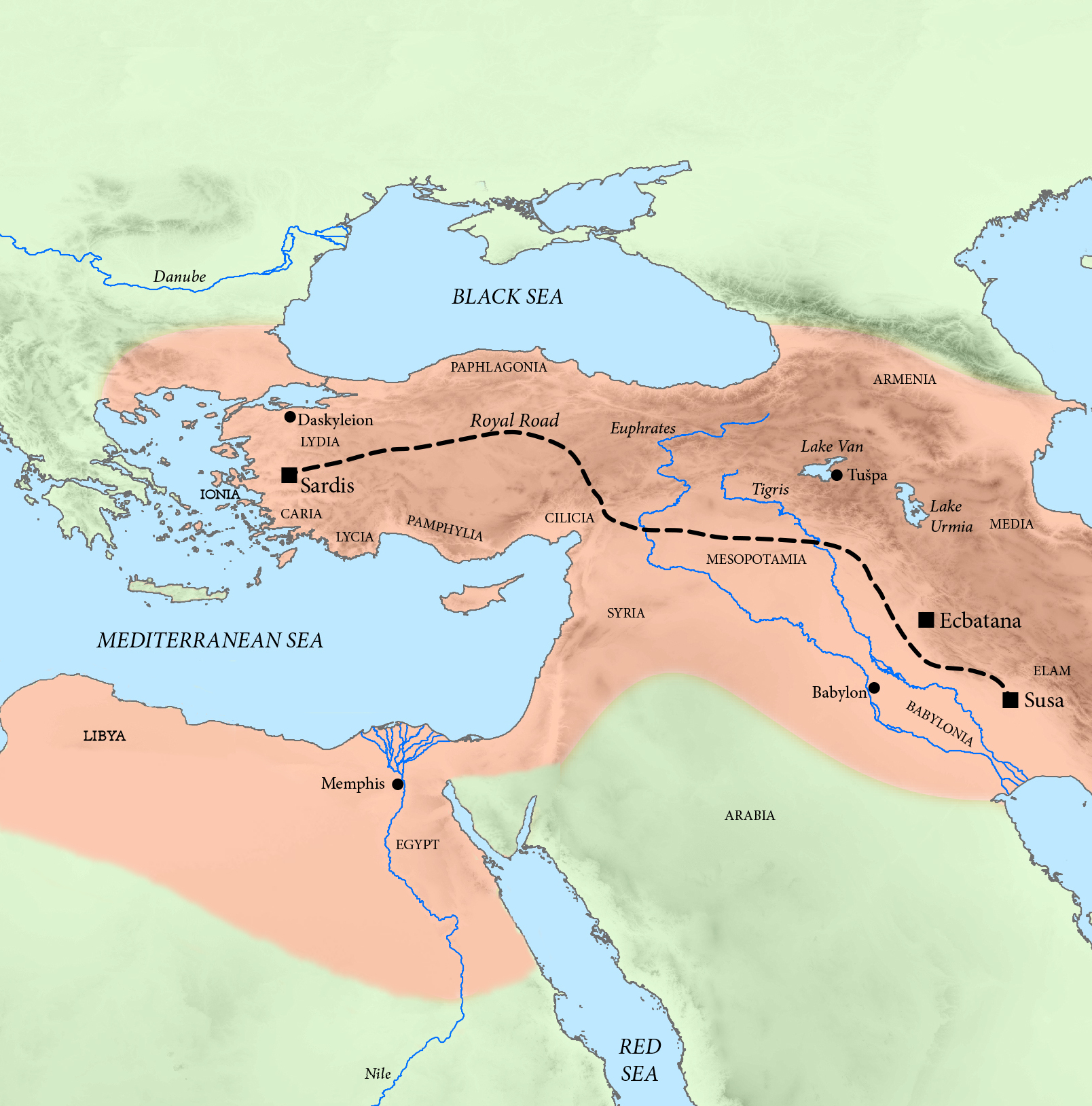
- Pherendates was satrap of the Achaemenid Province of Egypt.
- Predecessor: Aryandes
- Successor: Achaemenes
- Dynasty: 27th Dynasty
- Pharaoh: Darius I
- Father: Megabazus

Pherendates (Old Persian: *Farnadātah; Ancient Greek: Φερενδάτης, romanized: Pherendā́tēs) was an Achaemenid satrap of ancient Egypt in the early 5th century BCE, at the time of the Achaemenid 27th Dynasty of Egypt.

== Career ==
A son of Megabazus, and an army commander under king Darius I, Pherendates is mainly attested from three letters written in Egyptian Demotic. He replaced the satrap Aryandes who was deposed by Darius around 496 BCE; although the exact accession date of Pherendates is unknown. Pherendates was definitely the satrap in 492 BCE.

In the aforementioned letters, certain priests of the local temple of Khnum at Elephantine asked Pherendates to take care of some of their business in their place, a rather standard request to the pharaoh (or his representative, such as in this case) in any period of ancient Egyptian history.

In 486–485 BCE a revolt occurred in Egypt, which was quelled in 484 BCE by a new satrap, Achaemenes. It is possible that Pherendates lost his life during the turmoil.

Preceded by Aryandes	Satrap of Egypt c.496 – c.486 BCE	Succeeded by Achaemenes
