= Achaemenes (satrap) =

5th-century BC Achaemenid satrap of Egypt

- Satrap of Egypt
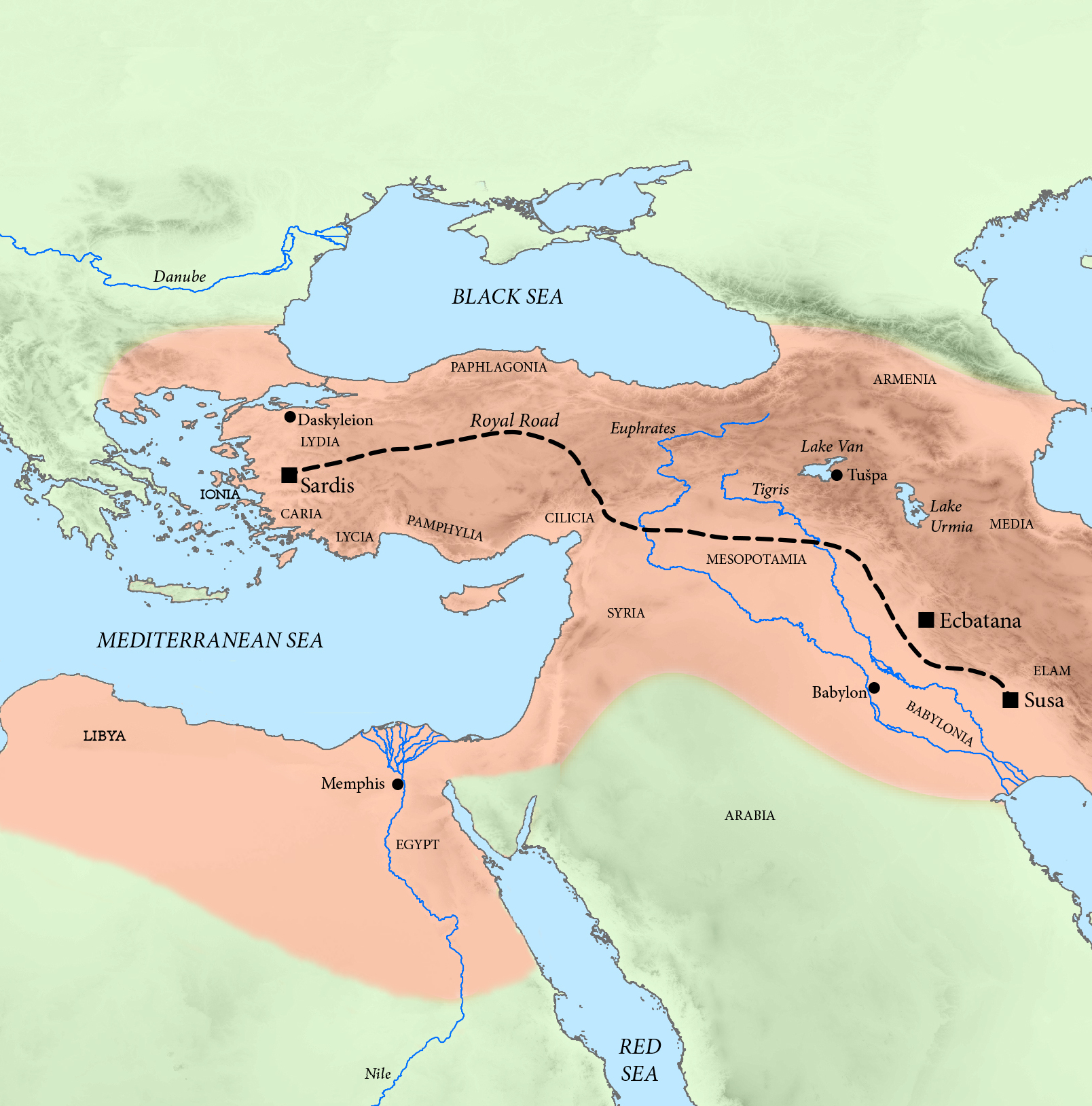
- Achaemenes was satrap of the Achaemenid Province of Egypt.
- Predecessor: Pherendates
- Successor: Arsames
- Dynasty: 27th Dynasty
- Pharaoh: Xerxes I and Artaxerxes I
- Father: Darius I
- Mother: Atossa

Achaemenes (Old Persian: 𐏃𐎧𐎠𐎶𐎴𐎡𐏁 Haxāmaniš; Ancient Greek: Ἀχαιμένης Akhaiménēs, also incorrectly called Achaemenides by Ctesias) was an Achaemenid general and satrap of ancient Egypt during the early 5th century BC, at the time of the 27th Dynasty of Egypt.

== Career ==
A son of king Darius I by his queen Atossa and thus a full brother of Xerxes I, Achaemenes was appointed satrap of Egypt some time between 486 and 484 BC, shortly after Xerxes' accession. At the time, Egypt was revolting against Achaemenid rule, and it appears likely that the previous satrap Pherendates lost his life in the turmoil. The rebellion, possibly led by a self-proclaimed pharaoh named Psammetichus IV, was eventually quelled by Achaemenes around 484 BC. After the victory, Achaemenes adopted a more repressive policy in order to discourage new rebellions, although the effect was actually the opposite.

When Xerxes launched the second Persian invasion of Greece (480–479 BC), Achaemenes was called to arms at the head of the Persian-allied Egyptian fleet and took part in the battle of Salamis (480 BC). Achaemenes survived the defeat, and was sent back to Egypt in order to resume his duties as satrap.

In 460 BC, under the leadership of a native prince named Inaros, Egypt revolted once more against Persian rule. Achaemenes confronted Inaros in the Battle of Papremis (459 BC) but was defeated and slain. Achaemenes' body was sent to king Artaxerxes I as an admonition.

Preceded by Pherendates	Satrap of Egypt c.486 – 459 BC	Succeeded by Arsames
