= Twenty-seventh Dynasty of Egypt =

525–404 BC Achaemenid province (satrapy)

Twenty-seventh Dynasty of Egypt 𐎸𐎭𐎼𐎠𐎹 Mudrāya (Old Persian)
- Province of the Achaemenid Empire
- 525 BC–404 BC
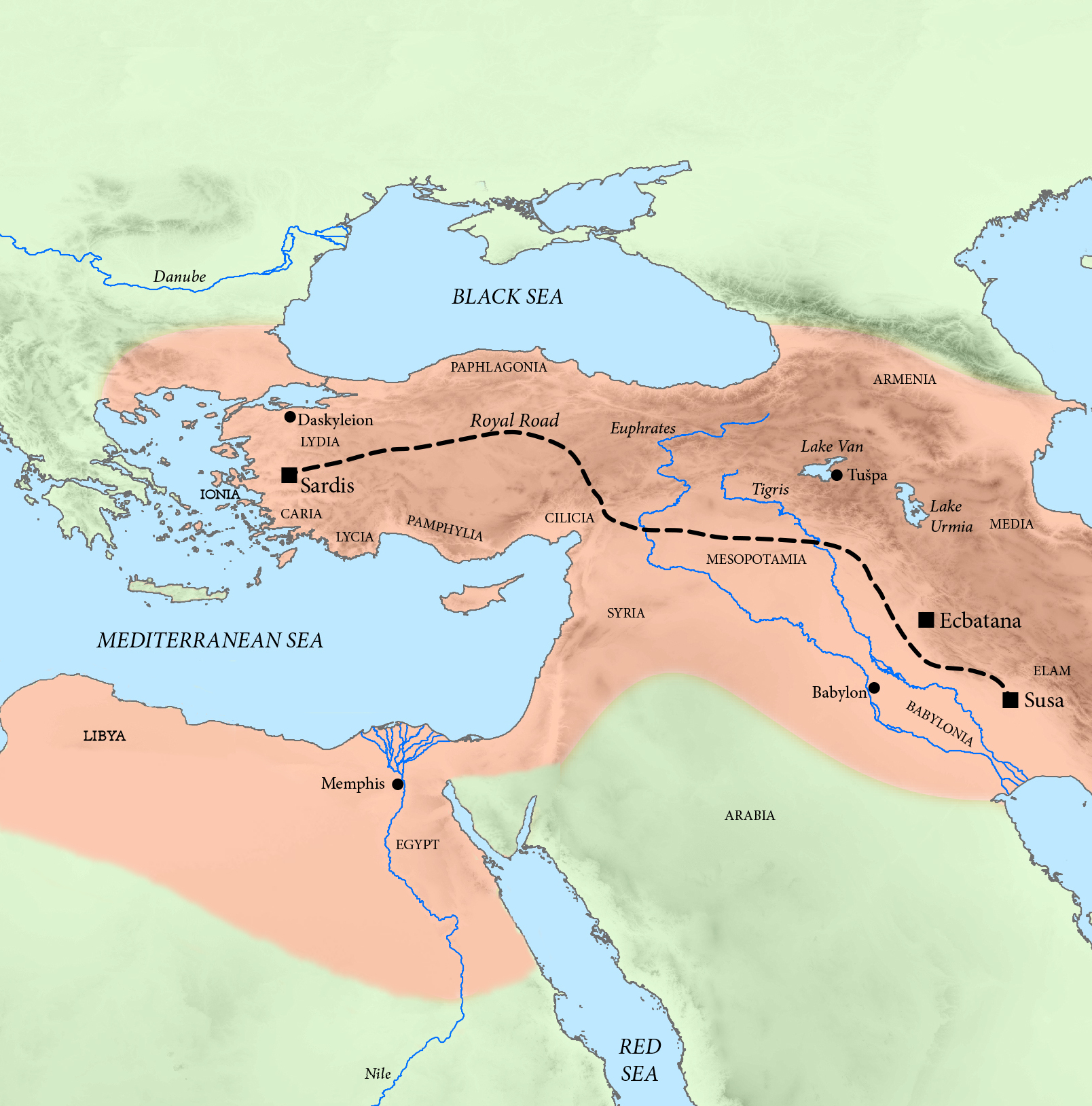
- Western part of the Achaemenid Empire, with the territories of Egypt.
- Government
- Pharaoh
  - 525–522 BC: Cambyses II (first)
  - 423–404 BC: Darius II (last)
- Historical era: Achaemenid era
  - Battle of Pelusium: 525 BC
  - Rebellion of Amyrtaeus: 404 BC
Preceded by	Succeeded by
Twenty-sixth Dynasty of Egypt	Twenty-eighth Dynasty of Egypt

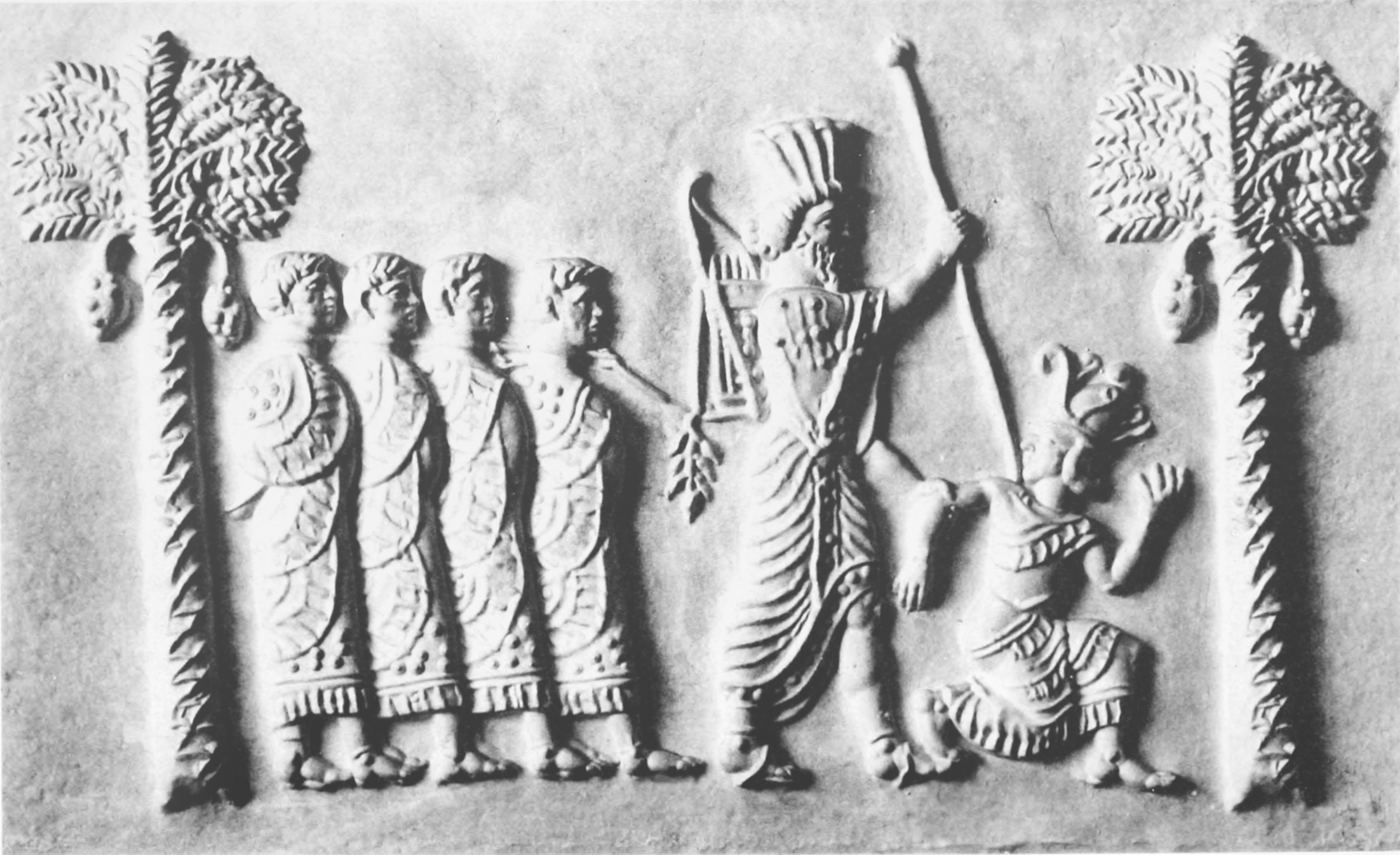
The Svenigorodsky cylinder seal depicting a Persian king thrusting his lance at an Egyptian pharaoh, while holding four captives on a rope.

The Twenty-seventh Dynasty of Egypt (notated Dynasty XXVII, alternatively 27th Dynasty or Dynasty 27), also known as the First Egyptian Satrapy (Old Persian: 𐎸𐎭𐎼𐎠𐎹, romanized: Mudrāya), was a satrapy of the Achaemenid Empire between 525 and 404 BC. It was founded by Cambyses II, the King of Persia, after the Battle of Pelusium (525 BC) and the Achaemenid conquest of Egypt, and his subsequent crowning as Pharaoh of Egypt. It was disestablished upon the rebellion and crowning of Amyrtaeus as Pharaoh. A second period of Achaemenid rule in Egypt occurred under the Thirty-first Dynasty of Egypt (343–332 BC).

== History ==
The last pharaoh of the Twenty-sixth Dynasty of Egypt, Psamtik III, was defeated by Cambyses II at the Battle of Pelusium in the eastern Nile Delta in May of 525. Cambyses was crowned pharaoh in the summer of that year at the latest, beginning the first period of Persian rule over Egypt, known as the 27th Dynasty. Egypt was then joined with Cyprus and Phoenicia to form the sixth satrapy of the Achaemenid Empire, with Aryandes as the local satrap (provincial governor).

As Pharaoh of Egypt, Cambyses' reign saw the fiscal resources of traditional Egyptian temples diminished considerably. One decree, written on papyrus in demotic script, ordered a limitation on resources to all Egyptian temples, excluding Memphis, Heliopolis and Wenkhem (near Abusir). Cambyses left Egypt sometime in early 522 BC, dying en route to Persia, and was nominally succeeded briefly by his younger brother Bardiya, although contemporary historians suggest Bardiya was actually Gaumata, an impostor, and that the real Bardiya had been murdered some years before by Cambyses, ostensibly out of jealousy. Darius I, suspecting this impersonation, led a coup against "Bardiya" in September of that year, overthrowing him and being crowned as King and Pharaoh the next morning.

As the new Persian King, Darius spent much of his time quelling rebellions throughout his empire. Sometime in late 522 BC or early 521 BC, a local Egyptian prince led a rebellion and declared himself Pharaoh Petubastis III. The main cause of this rebellion is uncertain, but the Ancient Greek military historian Polyaenus states that it was oppressive taxation imposed by the satrap Aryandes. Polyaenus further writes that Darius himself marched to Egypt, arriving during a period of mourning for the death of the sacred Herald of Ptah bull. Darius made a proclamation that he would award a sum of one hundred talents to the man who could produce the next Herald, impressing the Egyptians with his piety such that they flocked en masse to his side, ending the rebellion.

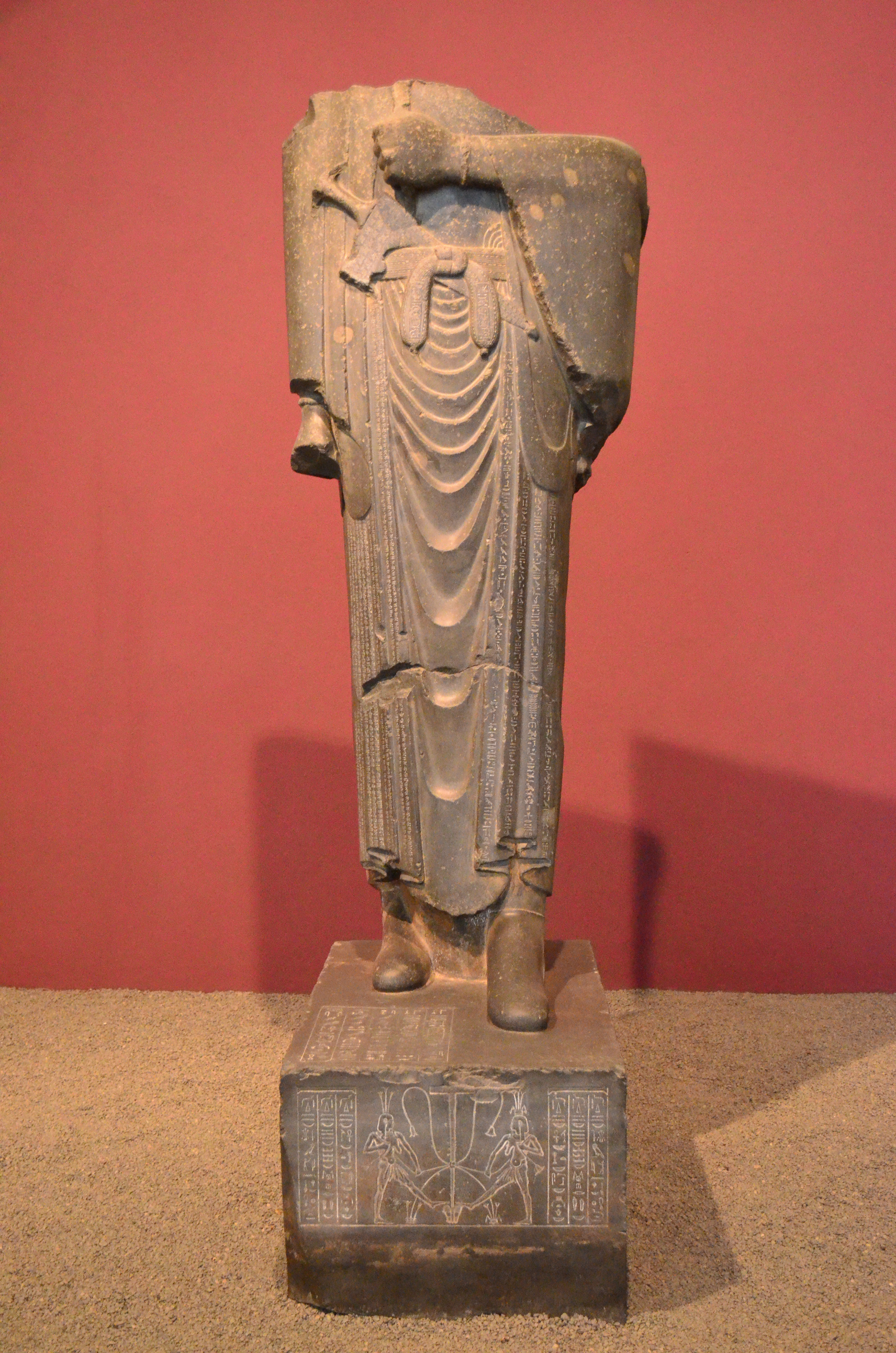
Egyptian statue of Darius the Great, discovered in the Palace in Susa.

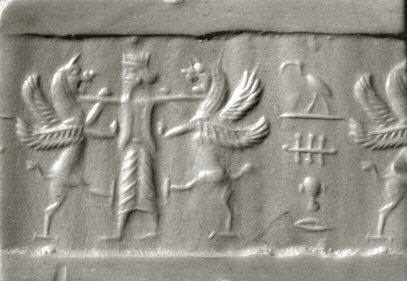
Modern impression of an Achaemenid cylinder seal from Iran, with king holding two lion griffins at bay and Egyptian hieroglyphs reading "Thoth is a protection over me". Circa 6th–5th century BC.

Darius took a greater interest in Egyptian internal affairs than Cambyses. He reportedly codified the laws of Egypt, and notably completed the excavation of a canal system at Suez, allowing passage from the Bitter Lakes to the Red Sea, much preferable to the arduous desert land route. This feat allowed Darius to import skilled Egyptian laborers and artisans to construct his palaces in Persia. The result of this was a minor brain drain in Egypt, due to the loss of these skilled individuals, creating a demonstrable lowering of quality in Egyptian architecture and art from this period. Nevertheless, Darius was more devoted to supporting Egyptian temples than Cambyses, earning himself a reputation for religious tolerance in the region. In 497 BC, during a visit by Darius to Egypt, Aryandes was executed for treason, most likely for attempting to issue his own coinage, a visible attempt to distance Egypt from the rest of the Persian Empire. Darius died in 486 BC, and was succeeded by Xerxes I.

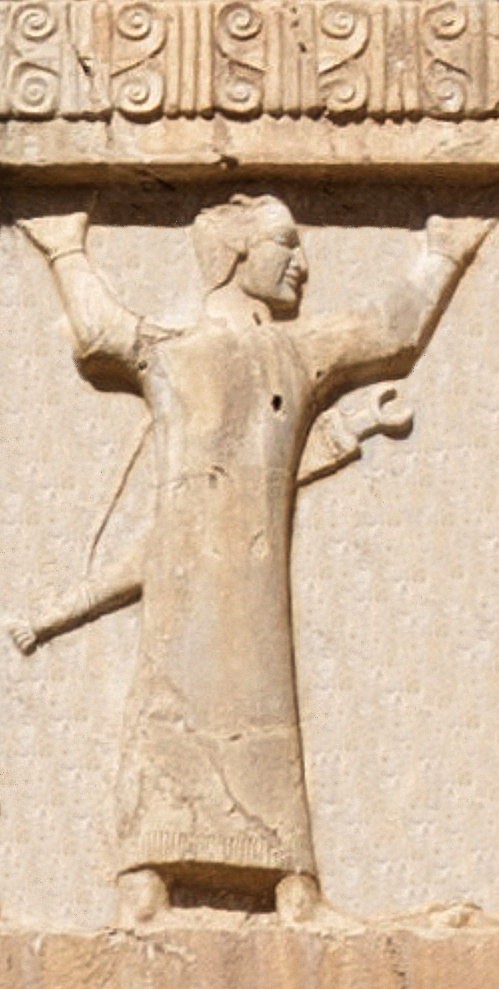
Egyptian soldier of the Achaemenid army, circa 470 BCE. Xerxes I tomb relief.

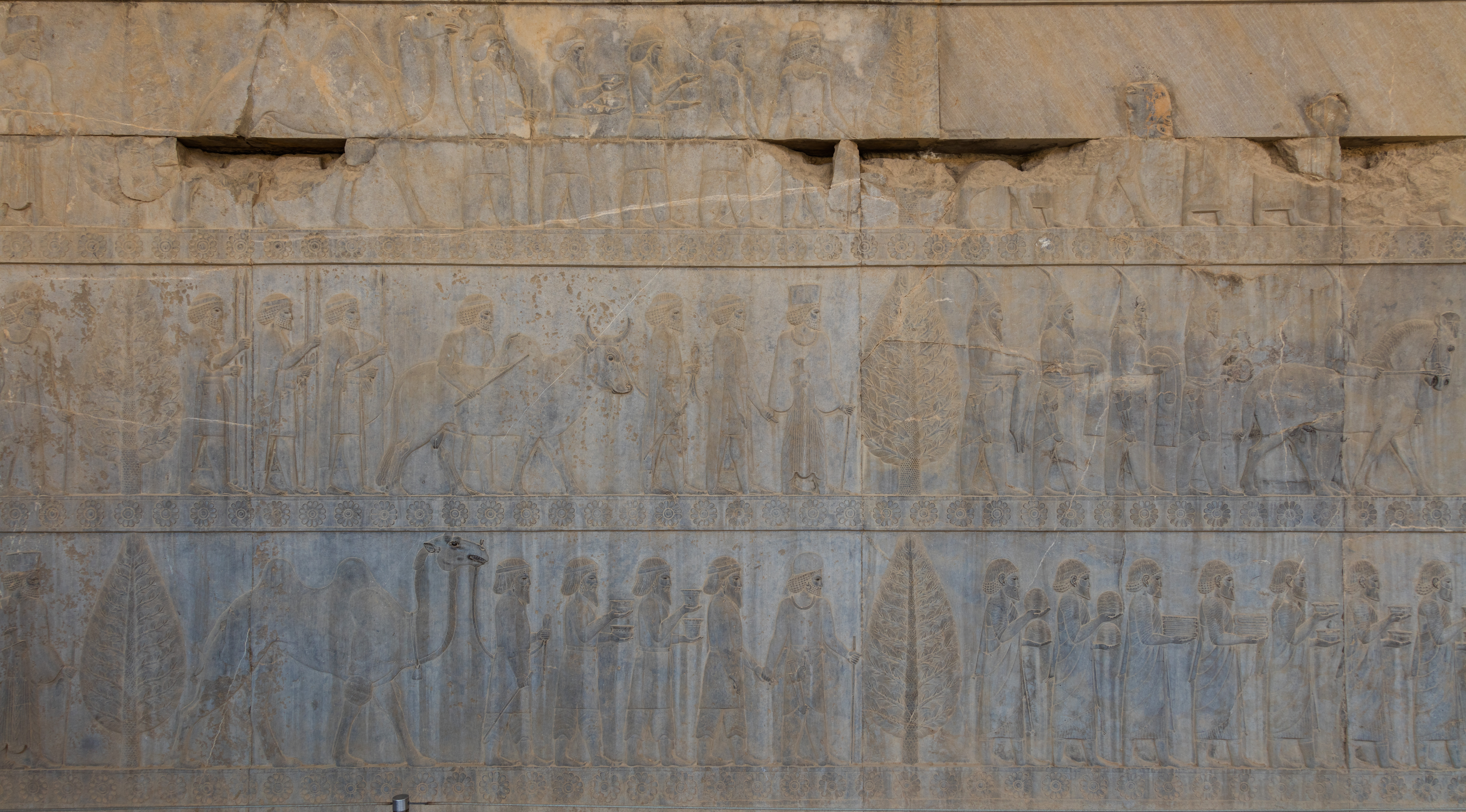
Egyptian delegation, relief from Apadana of Persepolis

Upon the accession of Xerxes, Egypt again rebelled, this time possibly under Psamtik IV, although different sources dispute that detail. Xerxes quickly quelled the rebellion, installing his brother Achaemenes as satrap. Xerxes ended the privileged status of Egypt held under Darius, and increased supply requirements from the country, probably to fund his invasion of Greece. Furthermore, Xerxes promoted the Zoroastrian god Ahura Mazda at the expense of traditional Egyptian deities, and permanently stopped the funding of Egyptian monuments. Xerxes was murdered in 465 BC by Artabanus, beginning a dynastic struggle that ended with Artaxerxes I being crowned the next King and Pharaoh.

In 460 BC another major Egyptian rebellion took place, led by a Libyan chief named Inaros II, substantially assisted by the Athenians of Greece. Inaros defeated an army led by Achaemenes, killing the satrap in the process, and took Memphis, eventually exerting control over large parts of Egypt. Inaros and his Athenian allies were finally defeated by a Persian army led by general Megabyzus in 454 BC and consequently sent into retreat. Megabyzus promised Inaros no harm would come of him or his followers if he surrendered and submitted to Persian authority, terms Inaros agreed to. Nevertheless, Artaxerxes eventually had Inaros executed, although exactly how and when is a matter of dispute. Artaxerxes died in 424 BC.

Artaxerxes successor, Xerxes II only ruled for forty-five days, being murdered by his brother Sogdianus. Sogdianus was consequently murdered by his brother Ochus, who became Darius II. Darius II ruled from 423 BC to 404 BC, and nearing the end of his reign a rebellion led by Amyrtaeus took place, potentially beginning as early as 411 BC. In 405 BC Amyrtaeus, with the help of Cretan mercenaries expelled the Persians from Memphis, declaring himself Pharaoh the next year and ending the 27th Dynasty. Darius II's successor, Artaxerxes II made attempts to begin an expedition to retake Egypt, but due to political difficulty with his brother Cyrus the Younger, abandoned the effort. Artaxerxes II was still recognized as the rightful Pharaoh in some parts of Egypt as late as 401 BC, although his sluggish response to the situation allowed Egypt to consolidate its independence.

During the period of independent rule, three indigenous dynasties reigned: the 28th, 29th, and 30th Dynasty. Artaxerxes III (358 BC) reconquered Egypt for a brief second period (343 BC), which is called the 31st Dynasty of Egypt.

H. P. Colburn (2019) analyses suggest Achaemenid legacy there was significant and the Egyptians had a wide variety of experiences in this period.

== Pharaohs of the 27th Dynasty ==
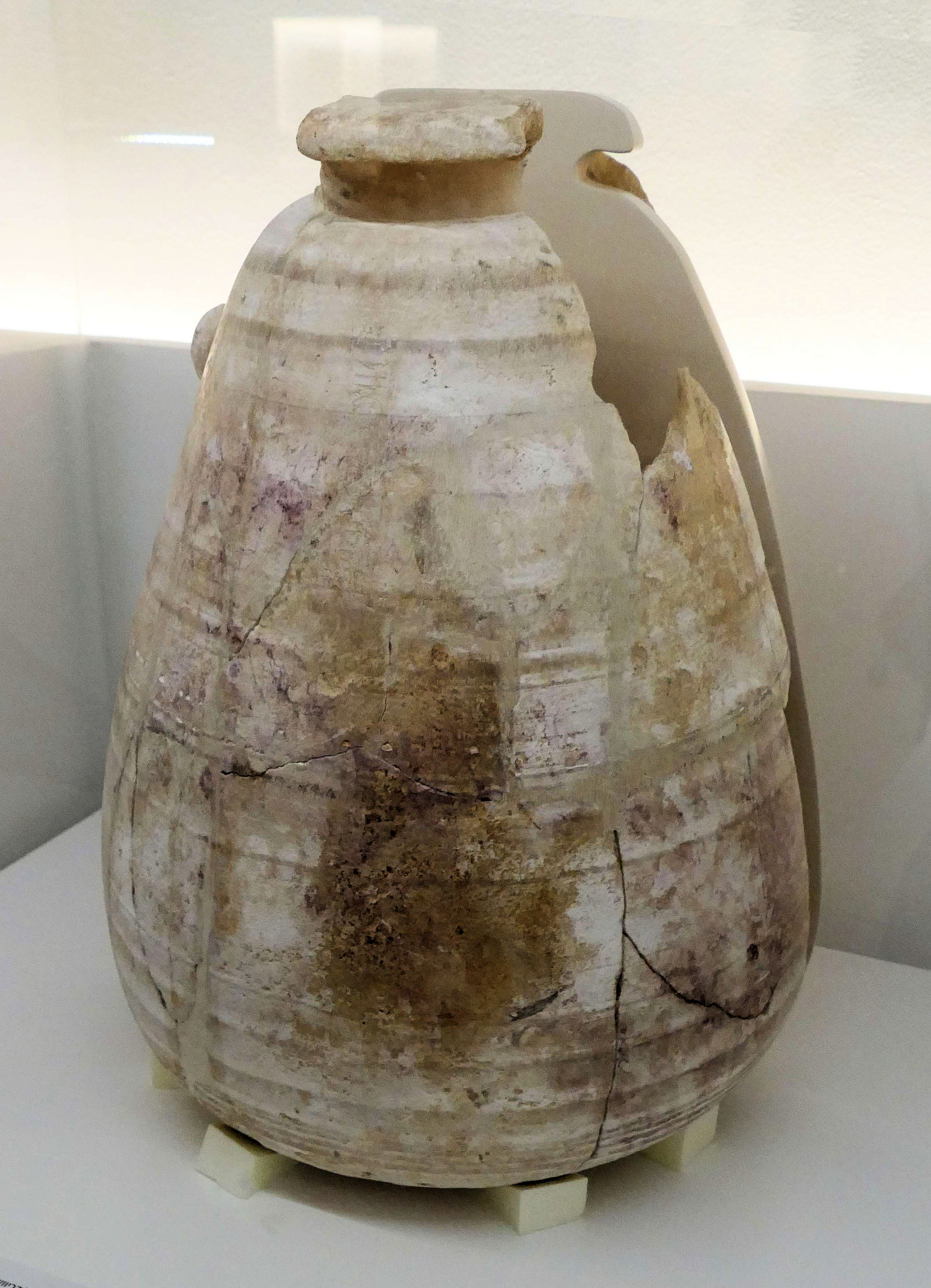
Egyptian alabaster vase of Darius I with quadrilingual hieroglyphic and cuneiform inscriptions. The hieroglyph reads: "King of Upper and Lower Egypt, Lord of the Two Lands, Darius, living forever, year 36".

The pharaohs of the 27th Dynasty ruled for approximately 121 years, from 525 BC to 404 BC. Rulers with violet background were native Egyptian pharaohs who rebelled against the Achaemenid rule.

Name of pharaoh	Image	Reign	Throne name	Comments
Cambyses II		525–522 BC	Mesutire	Defeated Psamtik III at the Battle of Pelusium in 525 BC
Bardiya/ Gaumata		522 BC		Possible impostor
Petubastis III		522/521–520 BC	Seheruibre	Rebelled against the Achaemenid Pharaohs
Darius I the Great		522–486 BC	Seteture	
Psamtik IV		480 BC		Proposed rebel against the Achaemenid Pharaohs
Xerxes I the Great		486–465 BC		
Artabanus		465–464 BC		Assassinated Xerxes I, later killed by Artaxerxes I
Inaros II		454 BC		Possibly son of Psamtik IV Rebelled against Artaxerxes I and took control over modern Alexandria. Was defeated by Megabyzus and crucified in Persia.
Artaxerxes I		465–424 BC		
Xerxes II		425–424 BC		Claimant to throne
Sogdianus		424–423 BC		Claimant to throne
Darius II		423–404 BC		Last pharaoh of the 27th Dynasty

== Satraps of the 27th Dynasty ==
Name of satrap	Rule	Reigning monarch	Comments
Aryandes	525–522 BC; 518–c.496 BC	Cambyses II, Darius I	Deposed following a revolt in 522 BC, later restored in 518 BC then deposed again by Darius I
Pherendates	c.496–c.486 BC	Darius I	Possibly killed during a revolt
Achaemenes	c.486–459 BC	Xerxes I, Artaxerxes I	A brother of Xerxes I, later killed by the rebel Inaros II
Arsames	c.454–c.406 BC	Artaxerxes I, Xerxes II, Artaxerxes II	Longest ruling satrap of Egypt

== Historical sources ==
- Herodotus (Histories)
- Fragments of Ctesias (Persica)
- Thucydides (History of the Peloponnesian War)
- Diodorus Siculus (Bibliotheca historica)
- Fragments of Manetho (Aegyptiaca)
- Flavius Josephus (Antiquities of the Jews)

== See also ==
- Thirty-first Dynasty of Egypt (343 BC–332 BC) — also known as the 2nd Egyptian Satrapy.

Preceded by Twenty-sixth Dynasty	Dynasties of Egypt c. 525 BC–404 BC	Succeeded by Twenty-eighth Dynasty
