= Fourth Philippic =

Speech attributed to Demosthenes and given in 341 BC

The Fourth Philippic is a speech attributed to the Athenian statesman and orator, Demosthenes and given in 341 BC. It constitutes the last of the four philippics. Modern scholars, however, consider that the speech is not Demosthenes' work and may be attributed to Anaximenes of Lampsacus who frequently wrote imagined dialogues or speeches for real figures. If it was a genuine Demosthenic speech, it is likely that it was issued in pamphlet form rather than actually delivered as a speech.

== Historical background ==
In 341 BC, when the embassy for which Demosthenes is calling in his fourth Philippic is sent to the Persians, Philip of Macedon is angry. Yet, the Persians reject the embassy.

== Content of the speech ==
In the Fourth Philippic, Demosthenes asks that money be sent because of an upcoming war with Macedon. He calls for Athens to send an embassy to the Persians. It includes two significant passages copied from Demosthenes' earlier On the Chersonese and Second Philippic speeches, leading to further doubts about its authorship.

== See also ==
- First Philippic
- Second Philippic
- Third Philippic

== Bibliography ==
- Henderson, J., ed. (1930). Demosthenes I: Orations 1-17 and 20. Loeb Classical Library. Harvard University Press.
