= On the False Embassy =

Oration by Demosthenes

"On the False Embassy" (Ancient Greek: Περὶ τῆς παραπρεσβείας) is the name of two famous judicial orations, both delivered in 343 BC by the prominent Athenian statesmen and fierce opponents, Demosthenes and Aeschines.

== Historical background ==
Since 357 BC, when Philip II of Macedon seized Amphipolis and Pydna, Athens was formally in a state of war against the Macedonians. In 347 BC, an Athenian delegation, comprising Demosthenes, Aeschines, and Philocrates, was officially sent to Pella to negotiate a peace treaty with the King. Philip imposed his own harsh terms that the Ecclesia officially accepted. Nevertheless, when an Athenian delegation, comprising once again Demosthenes, Aeschines and Philocrates, travelled in 346 BC to Pella to put Philip under oath for the final conclusion of the treaty, the King of Macedon was campaigning abroad. He expected that he would hold safely any Athenian possessions which he might seize before the ratification. Being very anxious about the delay, Demosthenes insisted that the embassy should repair to the place where they would find Philip and swear him in without delay. Despite his suggestions, the Athenian envoys, including himself and Aeschines, remained in Macedonia, until Philip successfully concluded his excursion in Thrace. Finally, the Peace of Philocrates was sworn in Pherae, but Demosthenes accused later the other envoys of venality.

From this moment, a fierce and long lasting judicial combat between Demosthenes and Aeschines begins, during which five orations were delivered: three of Aeschines (Against Timarchus, On the False Embassy, On the Crown), the only speeches he ever wrote, and two of Demosthenes (On the False Embassy, On the Crown). Timarchus was a wealthy and powerful Athenian, whom Demosthenes wanted as an ally in his judicial assault against Aeschines. In 345 BC, Timarchus and Demosthenes accused Aeschines on a charge of high treason: παραπρεσβεία γραφή (a criminal prosecution for a false embassy), meaning that the accused envoys did not comply with the orders of the state because of bribery or high treason. Timarchus and Demosthenes argued that Aeschines was bribed by Philip. Aeschines counter attacked by claiming that his accuser Timarchus had forfeited the right to speak before the people as a consequence of youthful debauches which had left him with the reputation of being a whore. Timarchus had been the eromenos of many men in the port city of Piraeus, a fact which had led to the popular impression that he had done so not for noble pederastic reasons but simply out of love of money. The suit succeeded and Timarchus was sentenced to atimia and politically destroyed. In 343 BC, the attack against Aeschines was renewed by Demosthenes in his speech On the False Embassy.

== Speeches ==
In his speech Demosthenes points out that he accuses Aeschines not only of his actions during the second embassy (346 BC) but of his actions during the first embassy as well (347 BC). He argues that the defendant favoured Philip and accuses him of the dilatoriness of the envoys. Aeschines is held personally responsible by the orator for his stance in Pella and for misguiding the Athenian people. As far as Thebes, Thrace and Phocis, Philip's intentions as interpreted and presented to the Assembly by Aeschines were never materialized. Thereby, the deceitful promises and assertions of the defendant allowed Philip to fulfil undisturbed his plans. Such a stance against the city allows just one explanation: corruption and venality of the defendant. Aeschines was bribed by Philip. Throughout his speech Demosthenes strives to prove the bribery through indications, but he has no undisputed evidence.

In his response, Aeschines exposes all the events of the two embassies, although the official text refers only to the second one. He tries to explain the reversal of his stance towards Philip after the siege of Olynthus. He argues that he was also deceived and that, if the hopes he gave to the people were not fulfilled, this was the outcome of luck. Henri Weil regards his speech as an advocacy of credulity, incompetence, and blindness. Aeschines is also criticized for not disclosing any coherent and stable political thought in his speech. He is however lauded for his eloquence, although it is argued that the essence falls short of the form.

== Outcome ==
Aeschines was finally acquitted by the narrow margin of thirty votes by a jury which may have numbered as many as 1,501. According to Harvey Yunis, though Aeschines won the case, Demosthenes nonetheless achieved his political objectives. Thirteen years later, in 330, Demosthenes' victory would be overwhelming (On the Crown). According to the same scholar, "on these occasions Demosthenes generated a war of words so intense and absolute that his two speeches are among the liveliest, most extraordinary examples of combative political argument ever produced. Of the two, On the Crown is the more compelling".
