= Peace of Philocrates =

346 BC peace treaty between Athens and Macedon

Peace of Philocrates is the name of the peace treaty concluded in 346 BCE between Athens and Macedon under Philip II. Philocrates was the name of the main Athenian negotiator of the Treaty.

== Background ==
Athens and Macedon had been at war since 356 BC, after Philip's capture of the Athenian colonies of Pydna and Potidea. The Third Sacred War began shortly after the Phocian seizure of the Temple of Apollo in Delphi. Athens allied herself with Phocis, against the other members of the Amphictyonic League. In 354 or 353 BCE, the Thessalians, having been defeated by the Phocians, requested that Philip become archon of Thessaly, to which Philip assented, drawing Macedon into the Sacred War. In 352 BC, Philip's erstwhile ally, the Chalkidian League (led by Olynthos), alarmed by Philip's growing power, sought to ally themselves with Athens, in clear breach of their alliance with Philip. In response, Philip attacked Chalkidiki in 349 BC, and by 348 BC, had completely destroyed the Chalkidian League, razing Olynthos in the process.

The prominent Athenian politician Philocrates had suggested offering Philip peace in 348 BC, during the Olynthian war. However, the Athenian Ecclesia (assembly) had effectively rejected this proposal by putting Philocrates on trial, and by the time he was cleared of the charges, it was too late to save Olynthos. The war between Athens and Philip thus continued through 347 BC, as did the Sacred War. In 347 BC, Philip sent privateers to attack Athenian colonies on various Aegean islands.

Philip had not involved himself in the Sacred War since his victory at the Crocus Field in 352 BC. In the meantime, it became clear that the Sacred War could only be ended by outside intervention. In 347 BC, the Thebans appealed to Philip for aid. He sent a small force to their assistance. That force was large enough to honour his alliance with Thebes, but not enough to end the war—he desired the glory of ending the war personally, in the manner of his choosing, and on his terms.

== Peace negotiations ==
In early 346 BC, Philip let it be known that he intended to march south with the Thessalians, though not where or why. The Phocians thus made plans to defend Thermopylae, and requested assistance from the Spartans and the Athenians, probably around 14 February. The Spartans dispatched Archidamus III with 1,000 hoplites, and the Athenians ordered everyone eligible for military service under the age of 40 to be sent to the Phocians' aid. However, between the Phocians' appeal and the end of the month, all plans were upset by the return of Phalaikos to power in Phocis; the Athenians and the Spartans were subsequently told that they would not be permitted to defend Thermopylae. It is not clear from the ancient sources why Phalaikos was returned to power, nor why he adopted this dramatic change of policy. Cawkwell suggests, based on remarks of Aeschines, that the Phocian army restored Phalaikos because they had not been properly paid, and further that Phalaikos, realizing that the army could not be paid and that the Phocians could no longer hope to win the war, decided to try to negotiate a peace settlement with Philip.

When the Athenians received this news, they rapidly changed policy. If Thermopylae could no longer be defended, then Athenian security could no longer be guaranteed. By the end of February, the Athenians had dispatched an embassy, including Philocrates, Demosthenes and Aeschines, to Philip to discuss peace between Athens and Macedon. The embassy had two audiences with Philip, in which each side presented their proposals for the terms of the peace settlement. In the first meeting with Philip, Demosthenes is said to have spoken eloquently. He then got on a little way into the subject and suddenly stopped speaking and stood helpless, until he collapsed completely. During this meeting, Aeschines made the case that Philip should hand the former Athenian colony of Amphipolis back to Athens in return for peace.

== Ratification ==
The embassy then returned to Athens to present the proposed terms to the Ecclesia, along with a Macedonian embassy to Athens, empowered by Philip to finalize an agreement. The Athenians debated the peace treaty in April and tried to propose that the peace take the form of a "common peace" in which all Greek states could partake (including Phocis). However, Demosthenes (at this point a strong proponent of peace) persuaded the Ecclesia that Philip would never agree to such a peace, and that Athens's vulnerable position meant that they had little choice but to accept Philip's terms. The treaty was therefore to be bilateral only, between Macedon and Athens (and her allies in the Second Athenian League). On 23 April, the Athenians swore to the terms of the treaty in the presence of the Macedonian ambassadors. Amongst the principal terms were that Athens become Philip's ally, and that they forever renounce their claim to Amphipolis.

After agreeing to the peace terms with Macedonian ambassadors in April, the Athenians dispatched a second embassy to Macedon, to extract the peace oaths from Philip; this embassy travelled to Pella at a relaxed pace, knowing that Philip was away on campaign against the Thracian king Kersebleptes. When they arrived, the Athenians (again including Demosthenes and Aeschines) were rather surprised to find embassies from all the principal combatants in the Sacred War were also present, in order to discuss a settlement to the war. Demosthenes became very anxious about these delays, and proposed that an Athenian delegation should sail without delay to any place where they might learn that Philip was to be found, and there receive from him the oath of ratification. Demosthenes later claimed that he was trying to prevent Philip seizing any more Thracian towns, but must have known that there was no chance of saving any of Kersebleptes's kingdom.

Despite his suggestions, the Athenian envoys, including himself and Aeschines, remained in Macedonia for three whole months, until Philip returned from Thrace, having subdued the whole country. When Philip returned from Thrace, he received both the Athenian and other embassies. The Thebans and Thessalians requested that he take the leadership of Greece, and punish Phocis; conversely, the Phocians, supported by the Spartans and the Athenian delegations, pleaded with Philip not to attack Phocis. Philip, however, delayed making any decisions; "[he] sought by every means not to reveal how he intended to settle things; both sides were privately encouraged to hope that he would do as they wanted, but both were bidden not to prepare for war; a peacefully arranged concordat was at hand"; he also delayed taking the oaths to the Peace of Philocrates. Military preparations were ongoing in Pella during this period, but Philip told the ambassadors that they were for a campaign against Halus, a small Thessalian city which held out against him. He departed for Halus before making any pronouncements, compelling the Athenian embassy to travel with him; only when they reached Pherae did Philip finally take the oaths, enabling the Athenian ambassadors to return home.

== Settlement of the Sacred War ==
The Peace of Philocrates is intimately linked with the final end of the Sacred War. It was in the aftermath of finally ratifying the Peace that Philip applied the coup de grace. He had persuaded the Athenians and other Greeks that he and his army was heading for Halus, but it seems certain that he also sent other units straight to Thermopylae. Thus, when he swore oaths to the Athenian assembly in Pherae, his troops were already very close to Thermopylae; by the time the Athenian ambassadors arrived home (9 July), Philip was already in possession of the pass. By delaying the oaths, and making what was effectively a feint against Halus, he prevented the Athenians from seeing their imminent danger, and from having time to try to garrison Thermopylae.

All of central and southern Greece was now at Philip's mercy, and the Athenians could not now save Phocis even if they abandoned the peace. However, the Athenians were still ignorant of this turn of events when Phocian ambassadors came to Athens to plead for military aid around 9 July. The Athenian council recommended that the peace be rejected, and Thermopylae be occupied in order to help save Phocis; since, as far at the Athenian embassy knew, Philip's troops were still in Pherae, there seemed to be ample time to occupy the pass. By 12 July the news that Philip was "in the gates" arrived in Athens; the Athenians then knew that the situation was hopeless, and instead of acting on the previous recommendation of the council, the Assembly instead passed a motion re-affirming the Peace of Philocrates. Demosthenes was one of those who recommended this stance. His argumentation, exposed in the oration On the Peace, was based on the fact that Athens was not ready for a war against all the other members of the League led by Philip. Thereby, he advised his countrymen to abide by the provisions of the peace, but he opposed Aeschines, who believed in an alliance between Macedon and Athens.

== Breakdown of the Peace ==
Although Demosthenes had been a principal architect of the Peace of Philocrates, almost as soon as it was made, he wished to be rid of it. In July 346 BC, he had been a proponent of saving Phocis, but unlike the rest of the Athenian assembly, he had insisted that the Athenians should still go to the Phocians' aid even when it was known that Philip was in control of Thermopylae. Over the next few years, Demosthenes became leader of the "war-party" in Athens, and at every opportunity he sought to undermine the peace: "His method was simple and effective. He kept hammering away at untruths until enough Athenians came to believe them." Demosthenes believed that all Philip's successes were due to his bribery and corruption of the Greeks, a view which, although there is little evidence for it, became commonplace until re-examined by modern historians. Conversely, there was also a substantial body of feeling in Athens, led by Aeschines, that the peace should be maintained and developed. The political trials of the time can be used to gauge sentiment in Athens; in 345 BC, Aeschines prosecuted Demosthenes's ally Timarchus, who was duly convicted; conversely, in 343 BC, Demosthenes prosecuted Aeschines, who was acquitted by the barest of margins. Until 343 BC therefore, the majority of the Athenian assembly therefore favoured maintaining the peace, even though they disliked it. Philocrates himself however, seeing that his policy was generally unpopular, had gone into exile before 343 BC.

Between 344 and 342 BC, Philip tried to strengthen the peace, by converting it into a 'common peace', that all Greek states could join. In 344 BC, the orator Python was sent by Philip to Athens to defend Philip against the attacks of the war-party, and to propose possible changes to the peace. In response, Demosthenes delivered one of his most effective and famous speeches, the so-called Second Philippic, attacking Philip and all his works. His ally Hegesippus then proposed that the peace should indeed be amended, such that Philip should cede Amphipolis to Athens. The Assembly, stirred by Demosthenes' oratory, passed the motion, leaving the Macedonian embassy speechless—clearly, Philip could not, and would not give up Amphipolis. An Athenian embassy sent to Pella to discuss this proposal was given short shrift by Philip. However, Philip left the offer of a common peace open until 342 BC, when the Athenians again formally rejected the idea.

From 343 BC onwards, in order to try to disrupt the peace, Demosthenes and his followers used every expedition and action of Philip to argue that he was breaking the peace. For instance, in 342 BC, when Philip campaigned against the Cassopaeans, they declared that Philip was campaigning against Ambracia, and an Athenian expedition was duly dispatched—but to Acarnania, not Ambracia. Philip however seems to have had no intention of attacking Ambracia, and the expedition thus achieved nothing. Finally, in 341 BC, matters began to come to a head. Athens sent out new settlers to the cleruchs on the Chersonsese under the command of Diopeithes, who proceeded to ravage the territory of Cardia, an ally of Philip. Philip therefore wrote to the Athenians to demand that they desist, but in his speech "On the Chersonese", Demosthenes persuaded the Athenians that since Athens was effectively at war with Philip anyway, there was no need to do what Philip asked; Diopeithes therefore continued to cause trouble in Thrace. Then, in the Third Philippic of approximately May 341 BC, Demosthenes accused Philip of breaking the peace by intervening in the affairs of Euboea. Callias of Chalcis now emerged as a potential ally of the Athenians; still intent on unifying the cities of Euboea under his leadership, he had been disturbed by the number of Euboean cities, particularly Eretrea and Oreus, adopting a pro-Macedonian stance. In June 341 BC, Athens and Chalcis allied themselves, and proceeded to attack Eritrea and Oreus and install suitable governance in those cities. Callias then proceeded to harass the cities and shipping on the Gulf of Pagasae. Finally, in the Fourth Philippic delivered later in 341 BC, Demosthenes argued that Athens should send an embassy to the Persian king, requesting money for a forthcoming war with Macedon. The embassy was sent, much to Philip's anger, but was sharply rebuffed by the Persians.

In 341 BC, Demosthenes travelled to Byzantium, which entered into an alliance with Athens. The Athenian statesman struck a similar deal with Abydos, triggering Philip's petulance. The Athenians responded to Philip's grievances, denouncing the terms of the peace treaty, an action entailing the official declaration of war.

== Aftermath ==
The peace officially collapsed in 338 BC, when Philip passed Thermopylae, attacked the Amphissians, entered Phocis and seized Elateia. Demosthenes convinced the Thebans to enter their alliance against Macedon, when Philip made a final attempt to appease his enemies, proposing a new peace treaty. After his victory at the Battle of Chaeronea, Philip as the absolute ruler of ancient Greece imposed a new peace treaty, whose terms were very favorable for the defeated party but not as favorable as in the Peace of Philocrates.

== Bibliography ==
- Buckley, Terry (1996). Aspects of Greek history, 750-323 BC: a source-based approach. Routledge. ISBN 0-415-09957-9.
- Cawkwell, George (1978). Philip II of Macedon. Faber & Faber. ISBN 0-571-10958-6.
