= Batalus =

Ancient Greek musician

Batalus (Ancient Greek: Βάταλος) was a musician of ancient Greece who probably lived around the early 4th century BCE, largely known to us as an ancient Greek byword for effeminacy, lack of manliness, and sexual passivity.

He was, according to some writers, the author of lascivious drinking songs. According to the 4th-century rhetorician Libanius, Batalus was a flute-player, a native of Ephesus, and the first man that ever appeared on the stage wearing women's shoes and singing in a camp fashion, for which reason he was ridiculed in a comedy of Antiphanes. Whether the poet and the flute-player were the same, or two different persons, is uncertain.

The flute player must have lived shortly before the time of the orator Demosthenes, for the latter is said to have been nicknamed "Batalus", on account of his weakly and delicate constitution, or as a slur on his manhood, or for other reasons.

The 1st-century CE historian Plutarch noted that there was disagreement about how exactly Demosthenes had attained this nickname. In Aeschines' speech Against Timarchus, he says that Demosthenes claims it was simply a nickname he got from an aunt or nursemaid on account of a stammer (though whether this was intended to be an affectionate or derisive nickname is unclear).

Some have suggested that "Batalus" had simply been an Athenian slang word for "anus".
