= Third Philippic =

Oration by Demosthenes

The "Third Philippic" was delivered by the prominent Athenian statesman and orator, Demosthenes, in 341 BC. It constitutes the third of the four philippics.

== Historical background ==
In 343 BC, the Macedonian arms were carried across Epirus and a year later Philip II of Macedon turned his military activities towards Thrace. When the Macedonian army approached Chersonese, the Athenians became anxious about the future of their colony. An Athenian general, Diopeithes, ravaged the maritime district of Thrace, an offensive resulting in Philip's rage. The king sent a letter of remonstrance to Athens, demanding the immediate withdrawal of the Athenian troops from Cardia, which was occupied by the Macedonian army. Because of this turbulence, the assembly convened and Demosthenes delivered "On the Chersonese", convincing the Athenians, who would not recall Diopeithes.

The aftermath of the Peloponnesian War gives Macedonia ample opportunity to expand its power. This prompts Demosthenes, leader of the Anti-Macedonian faction in Athens, to give his Philippic speeches and call for action against the Macedonian threat.

== Content of the speech ==
Within the same year, Demosthenes delivered the "Third Philippic". Putting forth all the power of his eloquence, he demanded resolute action against Philip and called for a burst of energy from the Athenian people. Macedon and Athens were already de facto belligerent parties, since the Athenians were financing Diopeithes, who was launching attacks against allied cities. Most importantly, Philip was the first who violated the terms of the Peace of Philocrates and Athens was just defending its legitimate rights. While the speech contains elements of Panhellenism, this attitude is inspired by Athenian patriotism. Any attempt at Greek unification, to Demosthenes, was only to ensure the survival of Athens. Demosthenes puts blame on indecisive Athenians for allowing Philip and Macedon to grow powerful. By using a blunt, direct tone in calling out Athenian complacency, Demosthenes hopes to instill a sense of urgency among the Athenians. Demosthenes uses Athenian anti-barbarian sentiment to rile up the Athenian people by labelling the Macedonians as a non-Greek people.

== Assessments ==
Demosthenes is regarded as the most effective of the Greek orators, with the Third Philippic being considered the best of Demosthenes' political orations, because of its passionate and evocative style. The opening sequence to the Third Philippic shows Demosthenes to be a virtuoso of the art of oration. From the moment he delivered the Third Philippic, Demosthenes imposed himself as the most influential politician of Athens and the suzerain of the Athenian political arena. He takes the offensive and devitalizes the "pacific" and pro-Macedonian faction of Aeschines. In the Third Philippic, the unchallengeable and passionate leader of the anti-Macedonian faction gives the signal for the Athenian uprising against Philip.

== See also ==
- First Philippic
- Second Philippic
- Fourth Philippic
