= On the Peace =

Famous oration by Demosthenes

"On the Peace" (Ancient Greek: Περὶ τῆς εἰρήνης) is one of the most famous political orations of the prominent Athenian statesman and orator Demosthenes. It was delivered in 346 BC and constitutes a political intervention of Demosthenes in favor of the Peace of Philocrates.

== Historical background ==
Just after the conclusion of the Peace of Philocrates, Philip II of Macedon passed Thermopylae, and subdued Phocis, which was not helped by Athens. Supported by Thebes and Thessaly, Macedon took control of Phocis' votes in the Amphictyonic League.

The Athenians had not been present at the council meeting that had voted for Philip's election into the council. However, Philip thought it proper to send letters to the states that had not been present, inviting them to assemble at Delphi so that they could ratify his election. Athens, among others, received the invitation. The invitation raised much ferment in the Athenian assembly, with many members indignant and opposed to Philips' election into the council. Yet, despite some strong and continuing opposition, Athens finally legitimised Philip's entrance into the Council of the League. Demosthenes was among those who recommended this stance in his oration On the Peace.

== The speech ==
The real subject of the oration is not peace, but the legitimation of Philip's participation in the Amphictyonic League. Ecclesia convened in order to take the final decision and Demosthenes was among those who expressed their opinion. He first argues that the current situation is unpleasant for the Athenians because of their own negligence (par. 1–3). He then refers to previous misjudgments of his countrymen (4–12) and asserts that Athens must avoid a war that would unify against it all the Greek cities (13–14) He argues that, if they do not recognize the new status quo in the Council of the League, they will cause a rift with the other members of the League (18–19). In order to convince ecclesia, he reminds his countrymen of the fact that in the past Philip had efficiently exploited Thebes' and Thessaly's interests, in order to use them for his own purposes. He is thus capable of repeating such a plot (20–23). Finally, the orator enumerates Athens' sacrifices for the sake of peace and argues that it would be unintelligent to break the peace because of the incident in Delphi. Nonetheless, he underscores that they must not accept any further concession to Philip (24–25).

According to A. W.Pickard, the Assembly were persuaded to give way. To have refused would have brought the united forces of the Amphictyonic States against Athens: and those they could not have resisted. It was therefore prudent to keep the peace, though Demosthenes evidently regarded it only as an armistice. A. Galinos regards Demosthenes' oration as model of the art of diplomacy and emphasizes on the pain and the psychological pressure Demosthenes must have suffered, arguing in favor of Philip's demands.
