= First Philippic =

Oration by Demosthenes

The "First Philippic" was delivered by the Athenian statesman and orator Demosthenes between 351–350 BC. It constitutes the first speech of the prominent politician against Philip II of Macedon. A philippic refers to a type of speech that is negative in tone and one that is comparable to a rant or a tirade.

This speech is said to have been Demosthenes' first powerful speech that he made in his lifetime; his earlier speeches were weak in tone and argument, as a result of which he had to practice over the years in order to produce the First Philippic as one of his most impactful ones.

Some scholars have debated on whether Demosthenes' philippics can be referred to as speeches, but rather "political pamphlets, cast in the form of speeches, designed for immediate effect on public opinion." In other words, they are utilized by his allies to spread his political views. The previous author also discusses the possibility that his speeches could have been prepared in advance; during preparation, Demosthenes filtered out prominent details and contextual information and only kept certain key points which he believed to have been necessary for his audience. As a result, they were not the speeches in their entirely, merely abridged versions. This is also known as the "pamphlet theory."

== Historical framework ==
Since 357 BC, when Philip seized Amphipolis, after agreeing in part to trade it for Pydna, Athens was formally in a state of war against the King of Macedon. In 352 BC, Demosthenes characterised Philip as the very worst enemy of his city, and a year later he criticized fiercely those dismissing Philip as a person of no account and warned them that he is as dangerous as the King of Persia. In 352 BC, the Athenian troops opposed Philip successfully at Thermopylae, but the same year the Macedonian army campaigned in Thrace and won a decisive victory over the Phocians in Thessaly, an event that shook the orator. At the same period that the King of Macedon launched his first attack against the federation of the Chalcidice and seized Stageira.

== Content of the oration ==
The theme of the First Philippic was preparedness. Demosthenes denounces Philip on account of his conquests of Pydna, Potidaea, and Methone. He laments the loss of these once-independent cities now under Philip's control. He calls upon the people, to whom he is addressing his philippic, to "chastise the insolence of this man." In his rousing call for resistance, Demosthenes urged the Athenians to be ready for war and called for a great outpouring of effort. He even proposed a reform of the theoric fund ("theorika"), a mainstay of Eubulus' policy. "Theorika" were allowances paid by the state to poor Athenians to enable them to watch dramatic festivals. Eubulus passed a law making it difficult to divert public funds, including "theorika", for minor military operations. Demosthenes encouraged his countrymen, trying to convince them that the defeats they suffered were due to their mistakes and to Philip's competence. The orator opposed the use of mercenaries in the Athenian army and proposed the creation of a flexible military force, which would remain in Macedon and harass Philip's army. He encourages fifty ships to depart and take action, as well as transport for the soldiers. That way, they would be prepared on all sides by any sudden attacks on Thermopylae, Chersonesus (modern-day Crimea), and Olynthus. Despite the passionate style of the orator, it seems that the Ecclesia of Athens did not espouse his views and insisted in the ensuing military preparations, obliging Demosthenes to repeat the same argumentation in the Olynthiacs.

Throughout his speech, Demosthenes speaks urgently and emotionally to his audience. He warns them that Phillip is power-hungry and eager to expand more. He will not stop. According to Demosthenes, he "is not able to rest satisfied with his present acquisitions, but is ever in pursuit of farther conquests; and while we sit down inactive and irresolute, encloses us on all sides with his toils." In other words, if the people are passive and do nothing while Phillip conquers, they will be defeated and under his control. Demosthenes also reveals what could be stated as prejudice against the Macedonians. Not only does he consider Phillip to be a great enemy, but also he considers it wrong that "a man of Macedon should conquer the Athenians, and give law to Greece."

== See also ==
- Philippic
- Second Philippic
- Third Philippic
