= Olynthiacs =

Three political speeches delivered by Demosthenes

The Olynthiacs were three political speeches, all delivered by the Athenian statesman and orator Demosthenes. In 349 BC, Philip II of Macedon attacked Olynthus, which at the time was an ally of Athens. In the Olynthiacs, delivered in 349 BC, Demosthenes urged Athens to help Olynthus.

== Historical framework ==
When Philip was enthroned, he cajoled the Chalkidian League, but, after the seizure of Amphipolis and the Macedonian expansion in Thrace, Philip sought for the elimination of the Chalkidian League and for the destruction of its most powerful city, Olynthus. The Olynthians foresaw the danger and struck a deal with the Athenians, who had been their enemies. In 350 BC, Philip had already seized thirty-two cities of the Chalkidike. The next year Olynthus sent successive delegations to Athens, asking desperately for military support, but the Athenians displayed no willingness for a military operation far away from their city.

== Content of the orations ==
In the "First Olynthiac", Demosthenes exhorted the Athenians to vote an expedition at once, to make instant preparation for its dispatch and to send ambassadors to state their intentions and watch events. He then proposed the reform of the "theoric fund" ("Theorika" were allowances paid by the state to poor Athenians to enable them to watch dramatic festivals). In the "Second Olynthiac", the orator bluntly expressed his annoyance for the dubious stance of his countrymen and for the fact that they remain idle. He also insisted that Philip was not invincible. In the "Third Olynthiac" he insulted Philip, characterizing him as a "barbarian" and warned his compatriots that the King of Macedon is quick to seize his opportunity, now yielding a point when it suits his purpose. He called for two distinct expeditions; one military force must be dispatched to rescue the Olynthians, and a second force, both naval and military, to ravage Philip's territory. He finally demanded a better utilization of the public money for the attainment of success abroad. Despite Demosthenes' warnings, the Athenians engaged in a useless war in Euboea and offered no military support to Olynthus. When they decided to implement some of his suggestions, the timing was wrong and their troops were inadequate.

== Assessments ==
The "Third Olynthiac" is regarded as the best of the three speeches and one of the best political orations of Demosthenes. It is distinguished because of the boldness of the expressed political ideas and the variety of oratorical means and expressions. All the three Olynthiacs demonstrate the passionate spirit of the Athenian statesman and his fervent desire to motivate his countrymen.

== Olynthiac Summaries ==
=== Olynthiac One ===
The First Olynthiac was an overall failure of a speech. Most people of Athens disregarded what Demosthenes had to say. This mainly is due to what he had put into his speech. The speech was mostly discussing the threat of Macedon and Phillip themselves. He mentioned how he believed the best course of action for the nation is to enact an incredibly high tax upon the people to fund the expedition. He made claims on how the Athenian army should handle the battles themselves. He stated that the navy shall sail in to attack Macedon itself while the army would go to the aid of Olynthian and fight the Macedonian army there as well. He came up with these elaborate plans trying to convince Athenians to rally and tell their government to do as he says. He also compared to previous blunders that Athens has done previously when dealing with other wars. He ended up almost mocking Athens in the past focusing on how they aren't to fail the same way again. He was very harsh on the wealthy people of Athens and how they hide with their money doing nothing with it. Claiming they should spend it on the war effort against Macedon.

=== Olynthiac Two ===
The Second Olynthiac was the most all over the place of the three Olynthiacs. The speech started with focusing on religion claiming that the gods would be against the actions of Philip. Saying that no just man would destroy the amount of land he was destroying. He then changed routes and went on to compliment Philip's successes. He called him a divine being who seems almost inhuman. He commented on every one of Philip's great achievements in war. He then turned to asking Athenians to accept a higher tax in order to support the war effort. He asked them to do anything they could to support the war like working the fields, tending to shops. He goes on about how the Olynthians are allies to Athens and it is Athens duty to support them in their time of need. He then changes routes again and starts to speak poorly about Athens as a nation. He discusses the failure that Athenians are by standing by and watching war rage on. He makes the claim that he is shocked that Athens has made it through previous wars due to their lack of action towards threats to them. He also was questioning the quality of generals of the Athenian army.

=== Olynthiac Three ===
The Third Olynthiac was undoubtedly the most successful of the three speeches. This is clear as to why when one is to read deep into the speech itself. Demosthenes is no longer targeting the Athenians and passing judgement to them. He was focusing more on the government itself claiming that he sees why there is no move to war. He now sees why the people are trying to protect what they have rather than charge into battle. He then counters this by saying he is with the Athenians in that regard but what of the Athens of the past. What of the Athens who fought against every threat to them and defended its allies. He was also more empathetic to people shouting from the crowd responding with tactics on how to solve their problems. One major one being the effect on the Theoric Fund and how it would be affected during the war time. He countered this with saying how the government of Athens has more money to spend on non necessities that bedazzle their homes. If they have such money they can spare some of it to help support people in need who are allies of Athens. He ends the speech not with a demand like before but a request. A request that the people of Athens look back in time and see what they used to be and hopefully decide that Philip must be stopped by any means necessary.

== See also ==
- Philippic
