= Philippic =

Damning speech to condemn a particular political actor

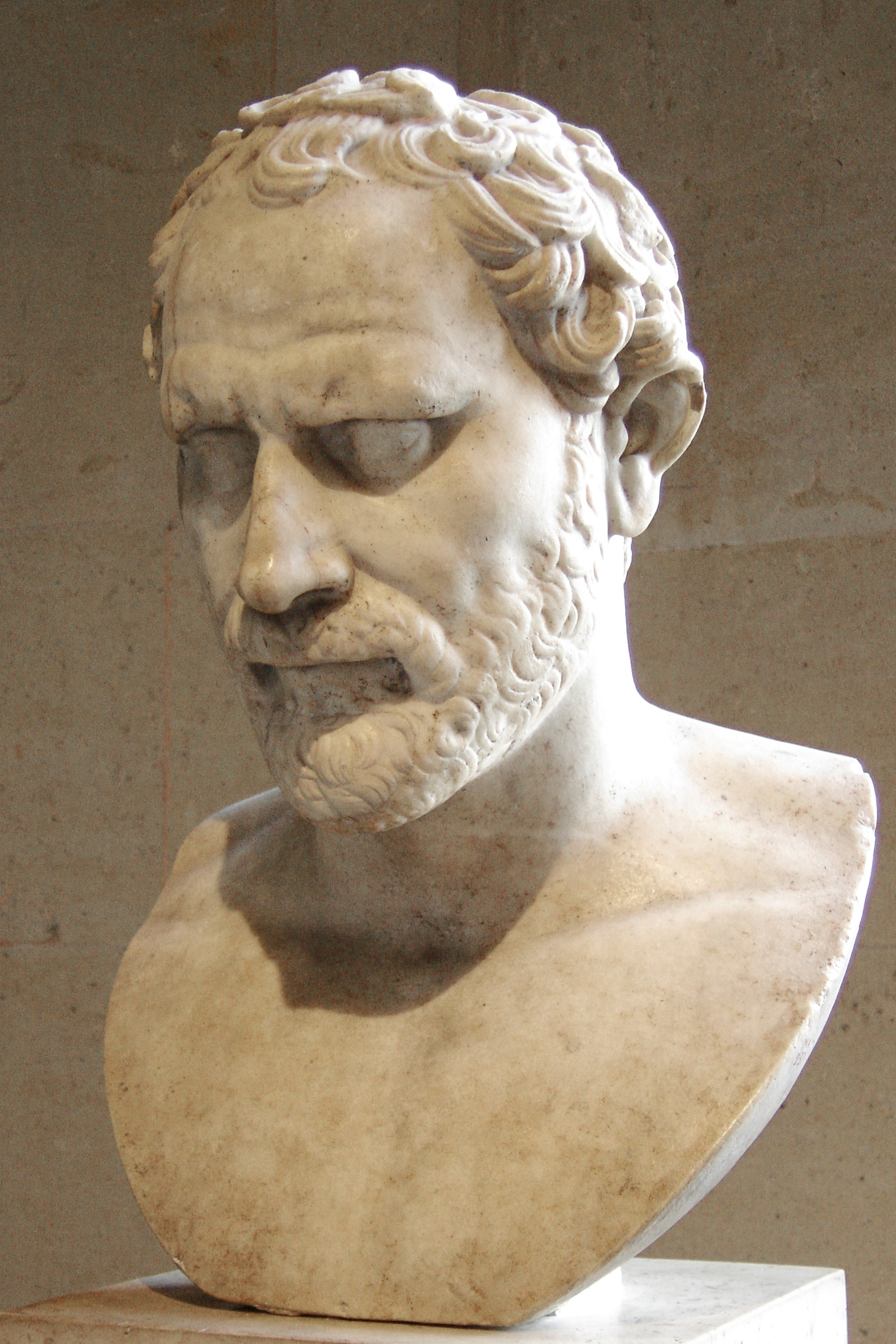
Bust of Demosthenes (Louvre, Paris, France)

A philippic (/fɪˈlɪpɪk/) is a fiery, damning speech, or tirade, delivered to condemn a particular political actor. The term is most famously associated with two noted orators of the ancient world: Demosthenes of ancient Athens and Cicero of ancient Rome. The term itself is derived from Demosthenes's speeches in 351 BC denouncing the imperialist ambitions of Philip of Macedon, which later came to be known as The Philippics.

== Greece ==
The original "philippics" were delivered by Demosthenes, an Athenian statesman and orator in Classical Greece, who delivered several attacks on Philip II of Macedon in the 4th century BC.

A First, Second, and Third Philippic have been ascribed to Demosthenes. A Fourth Philippic is also extant, but is of disputed authorship.

== Rome ==
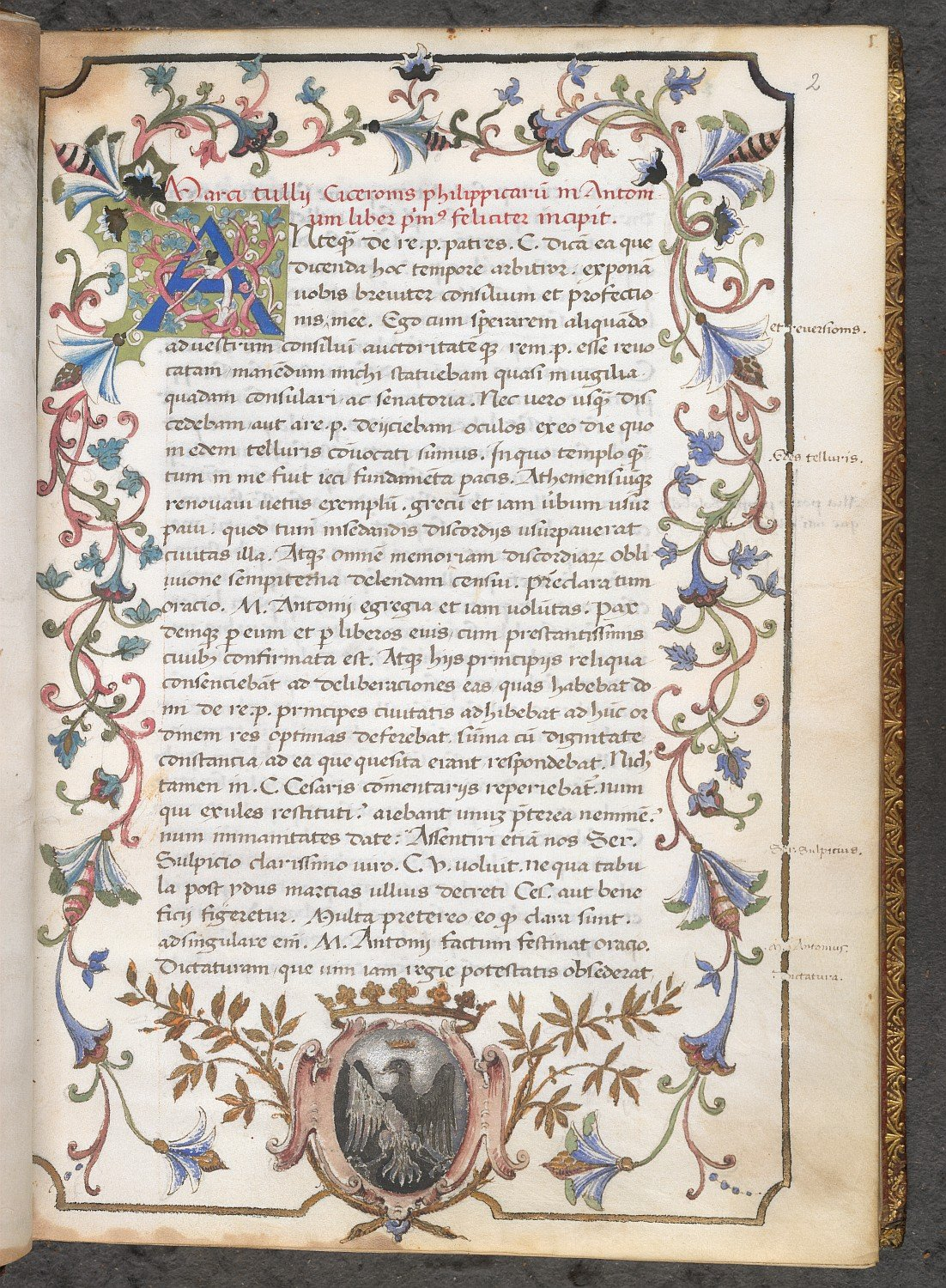
Cicero's Philippics, 15th-century manuscript, British Library

Cicero consciously modeled his own condemnations of Mark Antony on Demosthenes's speeches, and if the correspondence between Marcus Junius Brutus the Younger and Cicero is genuine [ad Brut. ii 3.4, ii 4.2], at least the fifth and seventh speeches were referred to as the Philippicae in Cicero's time. They were also called the Antonian Orations by Latin author and grammarian Aulus Gellius.

After the death of Caesar, Cicero privately expressed his regret that the murderers of Caesar had not included Antony in their plot, and he bent his efforts to the discrediting of Antony. Cicero even promoted illegal action, such as legitimatizing the private army of Gaius Octavius, or Octavian. In all, Cicero delivered fourteen Philippics in less than two years. Cicero's focus on Antony, however, contributed to his downfall as he failed to recognize the threat of Octavian to his republican ideal.

Cicero's attacks on Antony were neither forgiven nor forgotten, with the result that Cicero was proscribed and killed in 43 BC. His head and hands were publicly displayed in the Roman Forum to discourage any who would oppose the new Triumvirate of Octavian, Mark Antony and Lepidus.

According to Roman historian Tacitus, the Philippicae, together with the Pro Milone, In Catilinam, and In Verrem, made Cicero famous, and much of his political career sprang from the effect of these works. Others would have it that the Pro Ligario, in which Cicero defends Ligarius before Caesar, was the vehicle of his renown.

== See also ==
- Jeremiad (dolorous tirade, literary)
- Polemic
