= On the Chersonese =

Political oration delivered by Demosthenes in 341 BC

"On the Chersonese" is a political oration delivered by the Athenian statesman and orator Demosthenes in 341 BC. A short time later Demosthenes delivered one of his most famous speeches, the Third Philippic.

== Historical background ==
In 343 BC, the Macedonian arms were carried across Epirus and a year later Philip II of Macedon turned his military activities toward Thrace. He also imposed an amendment of the Peace of Philocrates in his favour. The war in Thrace lasted more than three years, and was one of Philip's most difficult campaigns. When the Macedonian army approached the Chersonese, the Athenians became concerned about the future of this region. An Athenian general, Diopeithes, ravaged the maritime district of Thrace, which angered Philip. The King sent a letter of reprimand to Athens, demanding the immediate withdrawal of the Athenian troops from Cardia, which was occupied by the Macedonian army. Because of this turbulence, Demosthenes delivered On the Chersonese during a meeting of the assembly.

== Content ==
With this speech Demosthenes exhorted, and finally convinced, his compatriots to support Diopeithes, although the general had previously committed certain injustices and was in exile. Demosthenes' only concern in this speech is to focus on Philip's wrongs towards Athens.
