= Philocrates =

4th-century BC Greek politician

Philocrates (Greek: Φιλοκράτης; floruit: 340s BC) was an ancient Greek politician from the Athenian deme Hagnous who first negotiated the Peace of Philocrates with Philip II of Macedonia after Philip devastated the city of Olynthos in 348 BC. The unpopularity of the treaty resulted in Philocrates being prosecuted in 343 BC by Hyperides for corruption (i.e. accepting bribes and favors from Philip II). Philocrates ultimately fled into exile and was condemned to death during his absence.
