= Second Philippic =

Oration delivered by Demosthenes between 344–343 BC

The "Second Philippic" is an oration that was delivered by the Athenian statesman and orator Demosthenes between 344–343 BC. The speech constitutes the second of the four philippics the orator is said to have delivered.

== Historical background ==
In 344 BC, Demosthenes barnstormed Peloponnese, in order to detach as many cities as possible from Macedon's influence. Nonetheless, his mission mainly failed, since most of the Peloponnesians saw Philip as the guarantor of their continued freedom and independence. They did not consider that the freedom of Greece was directly linked with the Athenian power, especially as the Athenians were allies of the Spartans. Thereby, Philip and certain Peloponnesian cities, including Argos, Messinia and Arcadia, sent a joint embassy to Athens to express their grievances. Athens' position was tough, since they wanted to keep their friendship with Sparta, but, at the same time, they did not want to accuse Philip of violating the Peace of Philocrates.

== Content of the speech ==
In response to the complaints of the Peloponnesian cities, Demosthenes delivered the Second Philippic, a vehement attack against Philip and his Athenian supporters. The most serious accusation against the King of Macedon is that he violates the terms of the peace of 346 BC. According to Demosthenes, his countrymen were misled by Philip's friends, who convinced them that the King of Macedon would save the Phocians and humiliate Thebes. Nevertheless, this oration is not as passionate as the "First Philippic", since Demosthenes prefers to foster caution.

== See also ==
- First Philippic
- Third Philippic
