= Aeschines =

Greek orator and statesman (389 BC-314 BC)

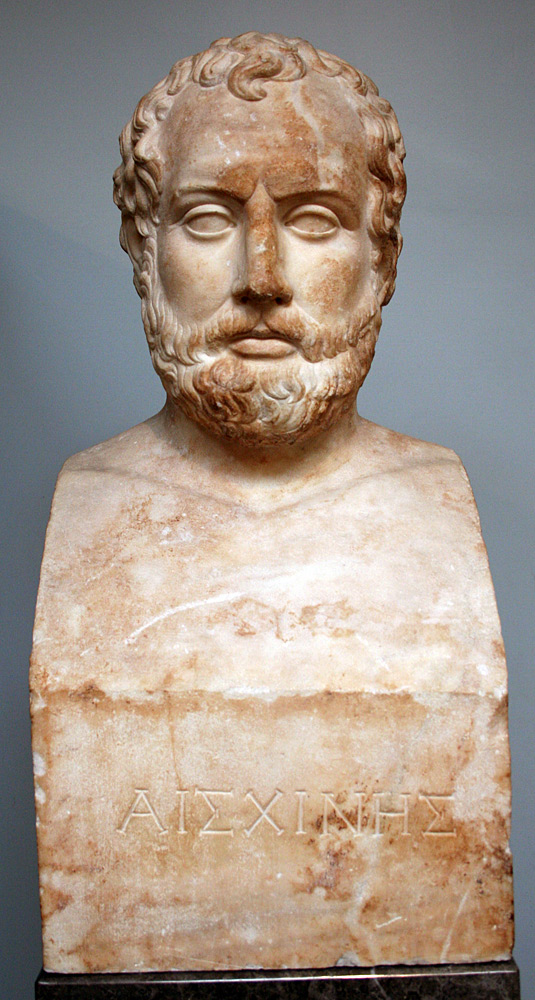
- Marble bust of Aeschines found in Heraclea Lyncestis, North Macedonia, now in the British Museum
- Born: 389 BC; Athens
- Died: 314 BC (aged 74–75); Samos

Aeschines (/ˈɛskɪniːz/; Greek: Ancient Greek: Αἰσχίνης Ἀτρομήτου Κοθωκίδης, romanized: Aischínēs Atromḗtou Kothōkídēs; 389–314 BC) was a Greek statesman and one of the ten Attic orators.

== Biography ==
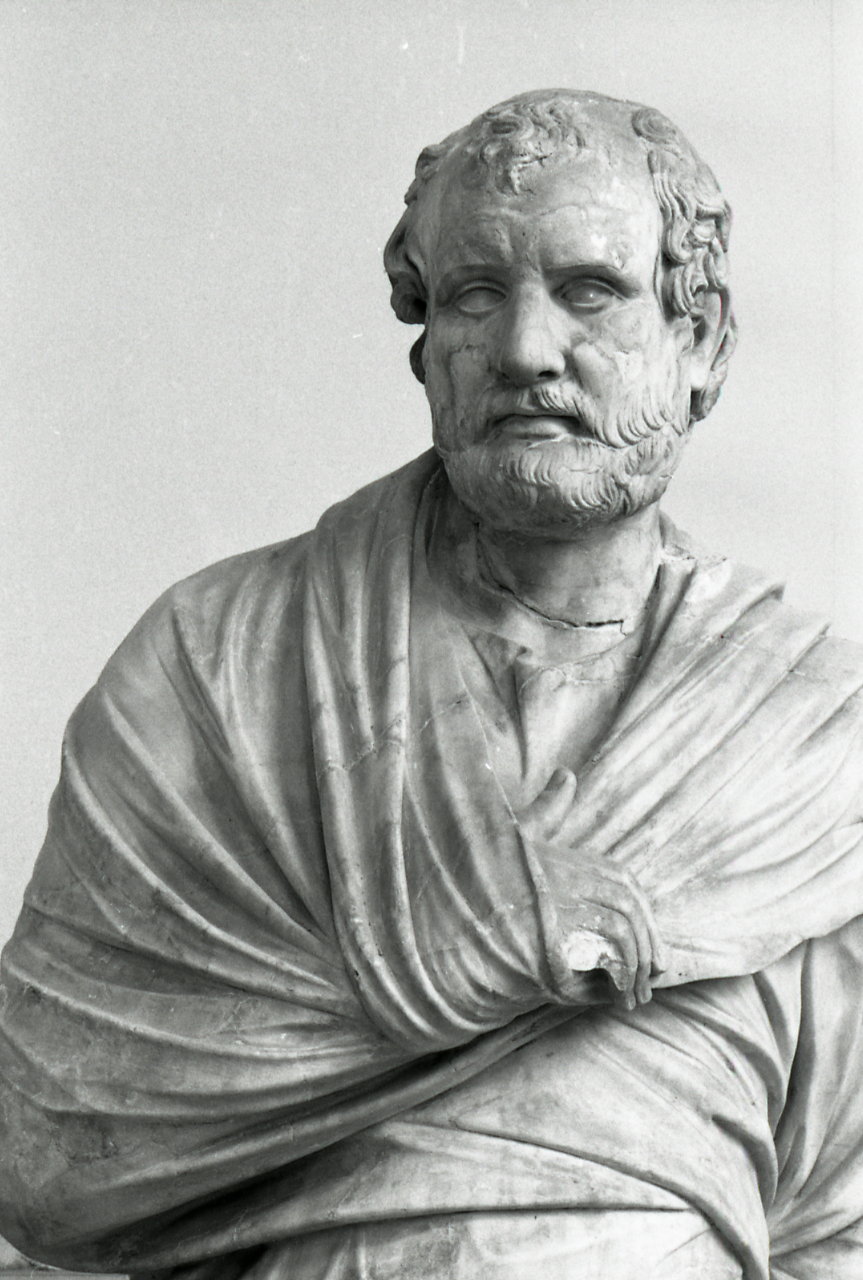
Statue of Aeschines, from Villa of the Papyri in Herculaneum. National Archaeological Museum, Naples. Photo by Paolo Monti, 1969

Although it is known he was born in Athens, the records regarding his parentage and early life are conflicting; but it seems probable that his parents, though poor, were respectable. Aeschines' father was Atrometus, an elementary school teacher of letters. His mother Glaukothea assisted in the religious rites of initiation for the poor. After assisting his father in his school, he tried his hand at acting with indifferent success, served with distinction in the army, and held several clerkships, amongst them the office of clerk to the Boule. Among the campaigns that Aeschines participated in were Phlius in the Peloponnese (368 BC), Battle of Mantinea (362 BC), and Phokion's campaign in Euboea (349 BC). The fall of Olynthus (348 BC) brought Aeschines into the political arena, and he was sent on an embassy to rouse the Peloponnese against Philip II of Macedon.

In spring of 347 BC, Aeschines addressed the assembly of the Ten Thousand in Megalopolis, Arcadia urging them to unite and defend their independence against Philip. In the summer 347 BC, he was a member of the peace embassy to Philip, where he found it necessary, in order to counteract the prejudice vigorously fomented by his opponents, to defend Philip and describe him at a meeting of the Athenian popular assembly as being entirely Greek. His dilatoriness during the second embassy (346 BC) sent to ratify the terms of peace led to him being accused by Demosthenes and Timarchus on a charge of high treason. Aeschines counterattacked by claiming that Timarchus had forfeited the right to speak before the people as a consequence of youthful debauches which had left him with the reputation of being a whore and prostituting himself to many men in the port city of Piraeus. The suit succeeded and Timarchus was sentenced to atimia and politically destroyed, according to Demosthenes. This comment was later interpreted by Pseudo-Plutarch in his Lives of the Ten Orators as meaning that Timarchus hanged himself upon leaving the assembly, a suggestion contested by some modern historians.

This oration, Against Timarchus, is considered important because of the bulk of Athenian laws it cites. As a consequence of his successful attack on Timarchus, Aeschines was cleared of the charge of treason.

In 343 BC the attack on Aeschines was renewed by Demosthenes in his speech On the False Embassy. Aeschines replied in a speech with the same title and was again acquitted. In 339 BC, as one of the Athenian deputies (pylagorae) in the Amphictyonic Council, he made a speech which brought about the Fourth Sacred War.

By way of revenge, Aeschines endeavoured to fix the blame for these disasters upon Demosthenes. In 336 BC, when Ctesiphon proposed that his friend Demosthenes should be rewarded with a golden crown for his distinguished services to the state, Aeschines accused him of having violated the law in bringing forward the motion. The matter remained in abeyance till 330 BC, when the two rivals delivered their speeches Against Ctesiphon and On the Crown. The result was a complete and overwhelming victory for Demosthenes.

Aeschines went into voluntary exile at Rhodes (to avoid the judgement of the jury, which was likely a large sum of money), where he opened a school of rhetoric. He afterwards removed to Samos, where he died aged 75. His three speeches, called by the ancients "the Three Graces," rank next to those of Demosthenes. Photius knew of nine letters by him which he called The Nine Muses; the twelve published under his name (Hercher, Epistolographi Graeci) are not genuine.

== Bibliography ==
Three of Aeschines speeches have survived:

- Against Timarchus
- On the False Embassy
- Against Ctesiphon (κατὰ Κτησιφῶντος)

=== Editions ===
- Gustav Eduard Benseler (1855–1860) (trans. and notes)
- Andreas Weidner (1872)
- Friedrich Blass (Teubner, 1896)
- Thomas Leland, Weidner (1872), (1878), G. A. Simcox and W. H. Simcox (1866), Drake (1872), Richardson (1889), G. Watkin and Evelyn S. Shuckburgh (1890).
- The Speeches of Aeschines. Translated by Charles Darwin Adams. Loeb Classical Library 106. Harvard University Press; London, William Heinemann Ltd. 1919. Available at archive.org
- Teubner ed. of Orationes: 1997, edited Mervin R. Dilts. ISBN 3-8154-1009-6
- Aeschines. Translated by Chris Carey. The Oratory of Classical Greece Volume 3. University of Texas Press, Austin, 2000. ISBN 0-292-71222-7

== Sources ==
=== Primary sources ===
- Demosthenes, De Corona and De Falsa Legatione
- Aeschines, De Falsa Legatione and In Ctesiphontem
- Lives by Plutarch, Philostratus and Libanius
- Exegesis by Apollonius

=== Secondary sources ===
- Stechow, Aeschinis Oratoris vita (1841)
- Marchand, Charakteristik des Redners Aschines (1876)
- Castets, Eschine, l'Orateur (1875)
- For the political problems see histories of Greece, esp. A. Holm, vol. iii (Eng. trans., 1896); A. Schafer, Demosth. und seine Zeit (Leipzig, 1856–1858).
- On Timarchos see "Aechines" in Encyclopedia of Homosexuality. Dynes, Wayne R. (ed.), Garland Publishing, 1990. pp. 15–16.
- Aeschines and Athenian Politics, Edward M. Harris, Oxford University Press (1995)
