= Decline of ancient Egyptian religion =

The decline of ancient Egyptian religion is largely attributed to the spread of Christianity in Egypt. Historical Christianity's strict monotheistic teachings did not allow the syncretism seen between ancient Egyptian religion and other polytheistic religions, such as that of the Romans. Although religious practices within Egypt stayed relatively constant despite contact with the greater Mediterranean world, such as with the Assyrians, Persians, Greeks, and Romans, Christianity directly competed with the native religion. Even before the Edict of Milan in AD 313, which legalised Christianity in the Roman Empire, Egypt became an early centre of Christianity, especially in Alexandria where numerous influential Christian writers of antiquity such as Origen and Clement of Alexandria lived much of their lives, and native Egyptian religion may have put up little resistance to the permeation of Christianity into the province.

== Background ==
Egyptian religion during the Pharaonic era had its roots in prehistory. For a period of nearly three millennia, Egypt largely assimilated any conquerors or invaders from outside of the country who entered. Rulers who came from outside, such as the Hyksos, did not have a significant impact either genetically or culturally, and state support of Egyptian religion rendered it essentially stable throughout the country's ancient history. Specific towns and areas of Egypt usually placed varying emphasis on different gods, and most temples were dedicated to a specific god. The religion played a critical role in the life of every Egyptian.

== History ==
=== Late Period ===
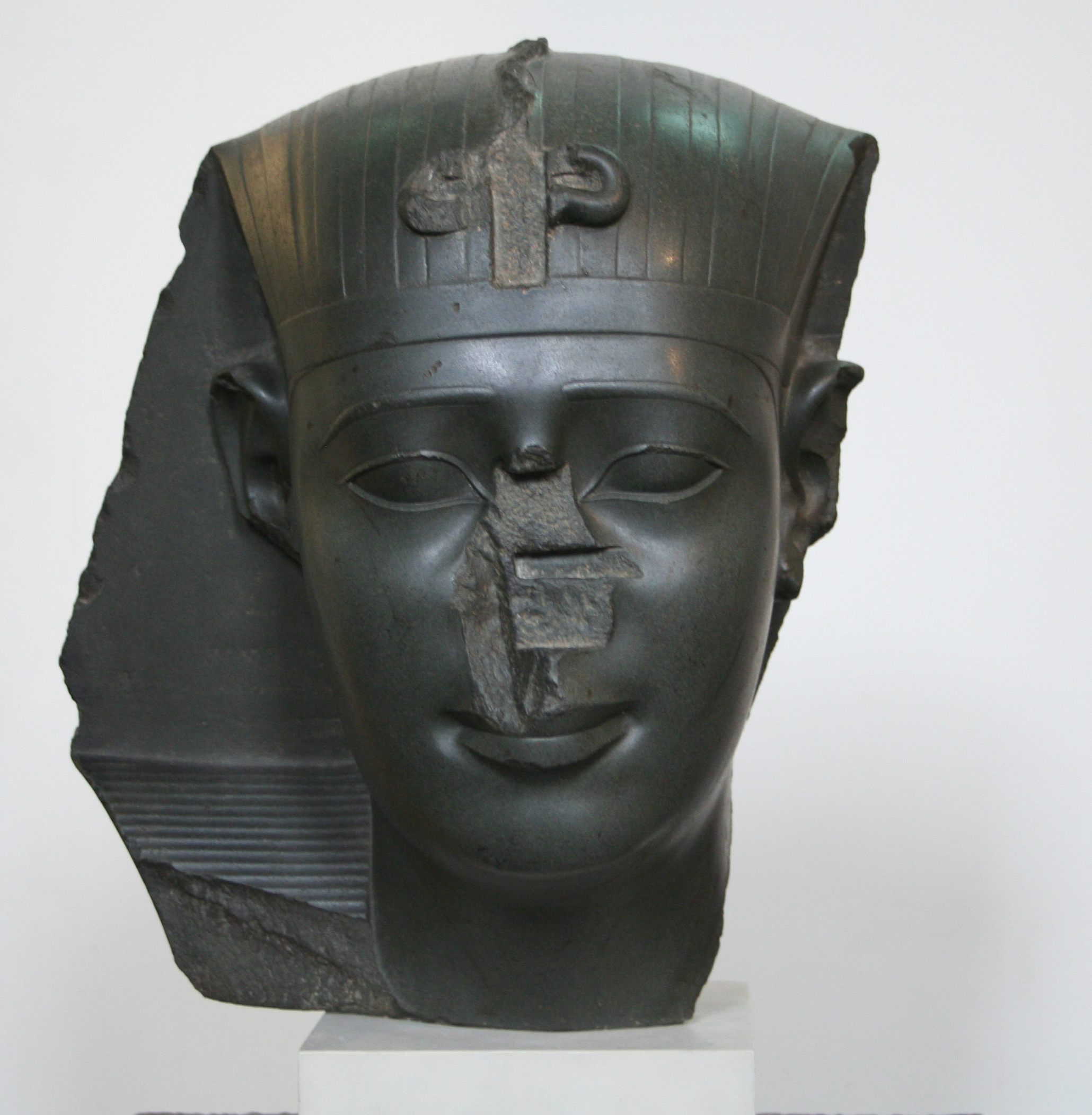
Nectanebo I, the founder of the 30th Dynasty

The establishment of the Twenty-sixth Dynasty of Egypt in 664 BC is traditionally considered to mark the beginning of the Egyptian Late Period. This era, lasting from 664 BC to 332 BC (the deposition of the final native pharaoh, Nectanebo II), apparently consisted of somewhat of a renewal of Egyptian culture, nationalism, and religion. Though Egypt experienced two separate invasions by the Achaemenid Empire, Persian rulers such as Cambyses II and Darius I respected Egyptian culture and religion and made no attempts to suppress it. Though Herodotus describes the Persian rule of Egypt as tyrannical and oppressive, and this is partly supported by the conscription of Egyptians into the Persian army and some slavery by the Persian upper classes, religious practices specifically did not suffer. Egyptian admiral Wedjahor-Resne, serving under Cambyses, records in his autobiography that Cambyses respected tradition and observance of religious customs in Egypt. When Cambyses placed a garrison of troops nearby the Temple of Neith at Sais, Wedjahor-Resne convinced the king to move them, as their presence may have been viewed as sacrilegious by the gods.

The Thirtieth Dynasty of Egypt, the last native rulers of Egypt for over 2,000 years, enabled Egyptian culture, religion, and art to flourish. Nectanebo I, the founder of this dynasty, became an accomplished builder, he worked on temples across the country and is responsible for initiating construction at the site of Philae. His grandson, Nectanebo II (who succeeded him after leading a military coup against the designated successor Teos), improved on this legacy and further established the dynasty as a time during which Egyptian culture thrived. The latter Nectanebo was thoroughly involved with religion and was quite enthusiastic about the cults of the gods, and art under his reign left a distinctive mark on the art of the Ptolemaic Kingdom. Nectanebo, though perhaps one of the more competent Egyptian kings of the Late Period, was ultimately unable to undo the centuries-long decline of the civilisation. Egypt would be conquered again by the Persians under Artaxerxes III in 343 BC, then by Alexander the Great nine years later in 332 BC. Although the deposition of Nectanebo II in 343 BC represents the end of Egyptian autonomy until the Republic of Egypt in AD 1953, over two millennia later, the end of native hegemony over Egypt can in no way be considered the end of ancient Egyptian culture in the country.

=== Syncretism with Graeco-Roman religion ===
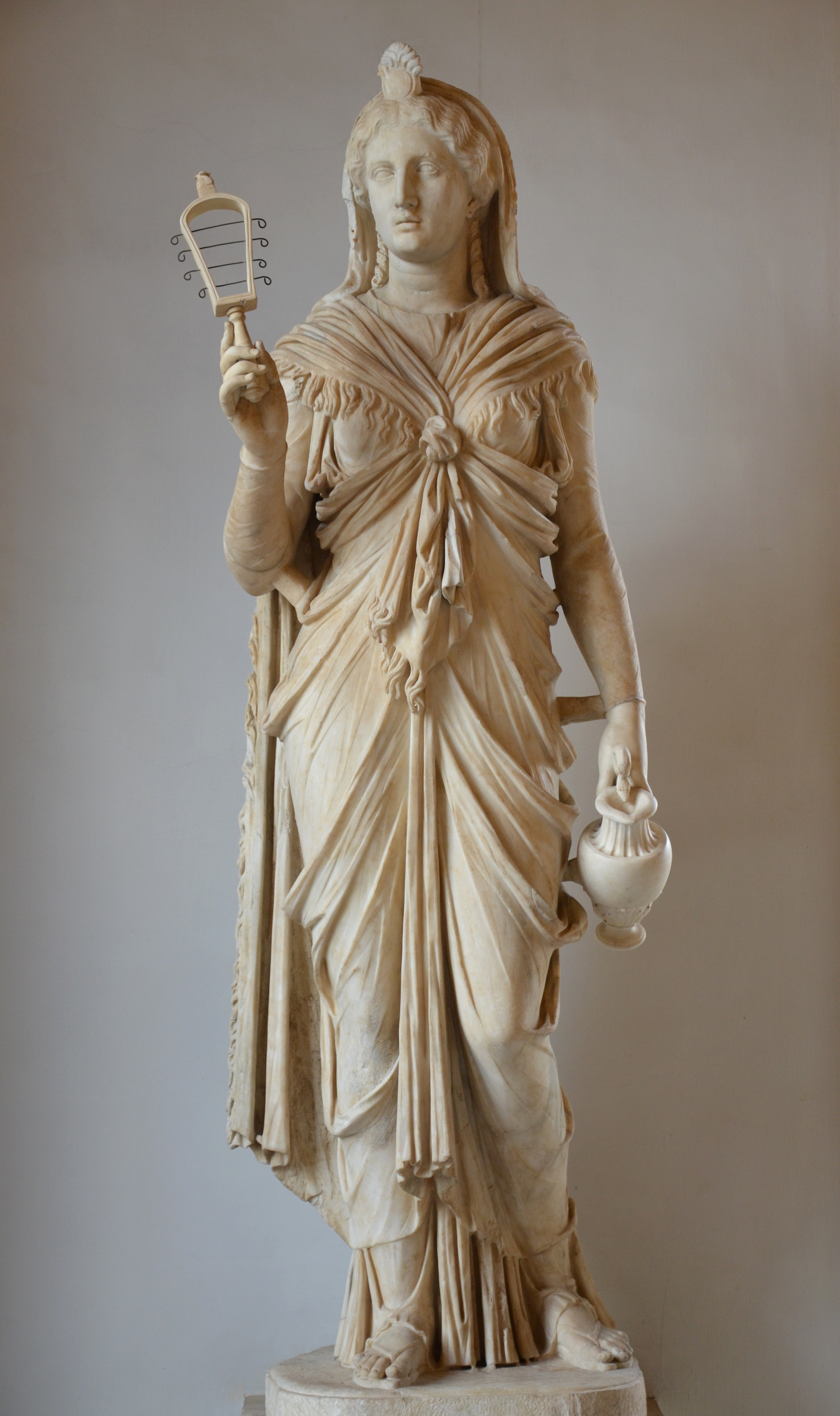
Distinctively Roman statue of Isis holding a sistrum and a situla, though they were added in a 17th-century reconstruction.

Egyptian religion initially came into contact with Graeco-Roman polytheism, which led to a large degree of syncretism rather than opposition. The cult of Isis spread first to the Hellenistic world in the Ptolemaic period after the conquests of Alexander the Great, and then to Italy and Rome. Though Augustus, after defeating Cleopatra and Mark Antony and annexing Egypt, disallowed statues to Isis and Serapis (another prominent god in Ptolemaic Egypt) within the pomerium, Egyptian deities nevertheless gradually became normalised in Roman religion and were considered by the emperors of the Flavian dynasty as patrons of their rule. In the second and third centuries AD, Isis and Serapis were worshipped in the majority of towns in even the western half of the empire, although they probably did not pervade the countryside. Temples to them exist from Palmyra in Syria to Londinium (modern-day London) in Britannia. In this way, Egyptian religion diffused into that of the Romans and enjoyed a wide range of worship all over the Mediterranean. Despite this, this intercultural diffusion almost certainly involved the modification (Hellenisation) of native Egyptian gods so that they were more palatable to converts. The form that Isis took among Greeks and Romans combined her Egyptian traits with Graeco-Roman ideas.

=== Christianity enters Egypt ===
The largest and oldest Christian church in Egypt, the Coptic Orthodox Patriarchate of Alexandria, credits its founding to Mark the Evangelist, c. AD 42. A considerable number of Jews resided in Egypt, and Alexandria specifically, with their residence in the country predating the first Christians by perhaps as long as 600 years. Scholars believe that downward social mobility of Jews in Roman Egypt made them more receptive to Christianity. In any case, Alexandrian Christianity began to grow rapidly starting from its very establishment. Under Pope Demetrius I, a bishop from AD 189 to 231, Christianity spread through Egypt up the Nile and increased its influence in the larger Church. Up until the Council of Chalcedon in AD 451, Alexandria was on par with Rome and Constantinopole as an influential Christian city.

==== Diocletianic Persecution ====
The Emperor Diocletian viewed Christianity as disrupting traditional Roman religion (and thus a greater threat to the solidarity of the empire), so he initiated a severe persecution of Christianity to attempt to curb its growth in the empire. Though this was not the first edict by an emperor against Christianity to affect Egypt (that being Septimius Severus in AD 202, when he dissolved the Catechetical School of Alexandria and forbade conversion to Christianity), the Diocletianic Persecution would be the most severe. In AD 303, Diocletian ordered all churches destroyed, sacred books burned, and enslaved all Christians who were not officials. This decree was in effect for three years, leading to the Era of Martyrs dating system later created by the Church of Alexandria, but many Egyptian Christians survived the persecution because they were instead sent to work in quarries and mines, as penal labour. Overall, however, the persecutions of Christianity were not successful anywhere in the Empire in ceasing its growth. Traditional religion was already beginning to suffer, even more so in Egypt, where Alexandria was an established and bustling centre for Christianity.

=== Decline of paganism in Egypt ===
Native Egyptian religion had at least a somewhat substantial effect on Graeco-Roman polytheism; in Egypt itself however, native religion likely felt little other effects from the new pagan rulers, until the advent of Christianity. Although Augustus built new temples and repaired existing ones in Egypt, Roman religious involvement in the province appears to have peaked here. Later emperors may have done the same on a much smaller scale, but it is evident by the complete lack of involvement after the Nerva-Antonine dynasty that Egyptian religion began to fragment and localise in the wake of the loss of centralisation as in Pharaonic and Ptolemaic Egypt.

Where the pagan religion of the Graeco-Roman world accepted the influence and integration of native Egyptian deities and practices into its tradition, Christianity was not nearly as accepting. The strict monotheism of the latter was in stark opposition to the freeform syncretism of paganism. Local Christians engaged in campaigns of proselytism and iconoclasm that contributed even more to the erosion of traditional religion. In AD 333, the number of Egyptian bishops is estimated to be just under 100; the Christianisation of the Roman Empire itself, and edicts by Christian emperors in the third and fourth centuries AD compounded the decline, and the last known inscription in hieroglyphics (regarded by some as a symbol of the decline of the religion itself due to their close ties) dates from AD 394, known as the Graffito of Esmet-Akhom. It is located at the temple of Isis on the island of Philae, in Upper Egypt believed to be one of the final remaining places of worship of native Egyptian religion. By this time, Egyptian religion was largely confined to the south of the country and to the distant, isolated Siwa Oasis in the west. This century also saw significant expansion of institutionalised Christianity into Egypt, but adherence to the old religion on a smaller, more local scale was still prevalent. Philae is also the site of the final demotic inscription, dating to AD 452. The temple was closed in AD 553 by Byzantine emperor Justinian I, who ruled from 527 to 565. As official temples fell into disrepair, and religious structures across Egypt declined, the religion gradually faded away.

Though imperial edicts fostered a negative atmosphere towards the pagans, they did not ultimately have a large effect on the disappearance of native religion by themselves. Provincial governors often found that enforcing "anti-pagan" edicts such as those of Theodosius I was incisive, especially in unstable regions, and especially so in Egypt. Though undoubtedly effective to check the civil authority of the cults, local village and town based practices seem to have been mostly unaffected by these edicts themselves. Rather, the erosion of native religion, and eventual destruction altogether, can be attributed to the priests, bishops, and monks who rampaged through the countryside, intent on "eradicating demons". A fiat of AD 423 prescribed penalties to Christians who disturbed the homes (including the shrines) of pagans who were "living quietly" and not breaking the law.

Instead, it is more appropriate to trace the decline of native religion to the state of its infrastructure. Where Augustus and other emperors of the first and early second centuries AD built in Egypt, and their benevolence is attested to at temples throughout the country, the Crisis of the Third Century exhibits much less imperial activity in the region and religion. Temples during this era entered "a state of progressive ruin", falling into disrepair.

The end of any vital existence for most village temples stripped away the literate and respected leadership class the priesthood had long provided and no doubt eliminated to a large degree the ritual occasions that lent the village a sense of itself as a community.

— Roger S. Bagnall, in Frankfurter 1998, p. 28

This degeneration of pagan temples for the final time (as opposed to previously, when religious infrastructure would still be repaired or replaced by the pharaonic, Ptolemaic, or early Roman rulers) represents the main cause for the fragmentation of native Egyptian religion in its later forms. Long since missing the central authority given by a pharaoh or even an emperor as seen with Augustus and other first-century emperors who conserved religious infrastructure in the country, Egyptian religion became more and more localised. Religious leaders gradually lost their authority, a probable factor in the conversions to Christianity contemporaneously and later on.

Still, at the end of the 5th century, the Neo-Platonist philosopher Heraescus, possibly the uncle and father-in-law of Horapollo, was buried according to pagan rites.

== Legacy ==
One of the final bastions of Egyptian religion, the Coptic language survived the Christianisation and later Islamisation of the country and remained fundamentally similar to the language of Pharaonic Egypt (although more similar to Late Egyptian than any other stage, especially grammatically), enduring for over a millennium before its relegation to a liturgical language by the 16th century. Coptic would give later Egyptologists a crucial insight into the phonology of the Egyptian language, partly because its writing system is not an abjad and thus records vowels, unlike hieroglyphics and hieratic.

Perhaps the most influential and recognisable legacies of Egyptian religion are the monuments erected in honour of it throughout Egyptian history. Temples, statues, the world-famous pyramids, the Great Sphinx of Giza, and other creations were heavily influenced by religion. In turn, the distinct style of ancient Egyptian architecture has reached the modern day through styles like Egyptian Revival architecture, and the integration and adaptation of religious motifs from Egypt into Western art after Napoleon's campaign in Egypt.

In late antiquity, however, the effects of Egyptian religion are clear on other religions. The Greeks and Romans both regarded Egypt as exotic and mystic, and this fascination with the country and its religion led somewhat to its diffusion around the Mediterranean. Deities like Isis and Bes made their way across the Mediterranean and the Near East, and the recherché view of Egypt sparked some Greek and Roman esoteric belief systems, Hermeticism being a notable tradition which arose from the reticent magical wisdom of Thoth.

Interest in Egyptian religion has led to attempted renewings of the religion. The contemporary revival of ancient Egyptian religion is known as Kemetism. It arose along with other neopagan religious movements in the 1970s.

== See also ==
- Decline of Graeco-Roman polytheism
- Christianity in Egypt
- Christianity and paganism
- Kemetism
