= Khedebneithirbinet II =

Queen consort of Ancient Egypt

- Burial: Saqqara
- Spouse: Nectanebo II (?)
- Dynasty: 30th dynasty
- Father: Nectanebo I or Teos

Khedebneithirbinet II ("Neith kills the evil eye") was an ancient Egyptian queen from the Thirtieth dynasty and is the last known native Egyptian queen consort of ancient Egypt.

== Family and background ==
Her husband may have been Nectanebo II (Nakhtnebef II), the last native Egyptian pharaoh, based on the fact that one of his shabtis was found in her burial at Saqqara. Nectanebo II fled south to Kush following the second Achaemenid conquest of Egypt in 343 BC.

Her father was possibly pharaoh Teos (Djedhor), Nectanebo II's predecessor and uncle. Alternatively, her father could have been pharaoh Nectanebo I, who was Djedhor's father.

== Burial ==
She was buried in the tomb of officials of the 26th dynasty in Saqqara. She was likely buried here some time after Nectanebo fled Egypt. Her burial contained surviving canopic jars and shabtis, now held in the Egyptian Museum in Cairo. All of these lack a cartouche. Another shabti held in the Petrie Museum of Egyptian Archaeology does have a cartouche, but this could have belonged to Khedebneithirbinet I instead.

== Bibliography ==
- Dodson, Aidan; Hilton, Dyan (2010). The Complete Royal Families of Ancient Egypt. United Kingdom: Thames & Hudson. ISBN 978-0-500-28857-3.
- Tyldesley, Joyce (2006). Chronicle of the Queens of Egypt. United Kingdom: Thames & Hudson. ISBN 0-500-05145-3.
