= Gold (hieroglyph) =

Egyptian hieroglyph

S12
Gold
in hieroglyphs

The Egyptian hieroglyph representing gold (𓋞 Gardiner S12), phonetic value nb, is important due to its use in the Horus-of-Gold name, one of the Fivefold Titulary names of the Egyptian pharaoh. In its determinative usage, it identifies any precious metal, and as an ideogram in "gold" specifically (Egyptian nbw, whence Coptic ⲛⲟⲩⲃ nūb).

The hieroglyph represents a large gold necklace whose ends drape off either side and seven pearl pendants dangling from the middle. Old Kingdom scenes show dwarfs metalworking the gold, and "stringing the pearls of gold".

== Derived forms ==
Three variants of the gold hieroglyph are ligatured with another hieroglyph:

S14 Gold and mace (club) for "silver."
S13 Egyptian language nbi, for "gild", or "gilt." (Gold and Foot).
S14A Gold and was scepter-("uas scepter"), for "electrum", dj'm.

== Usage ==
=== Horus-of-Gold name ===
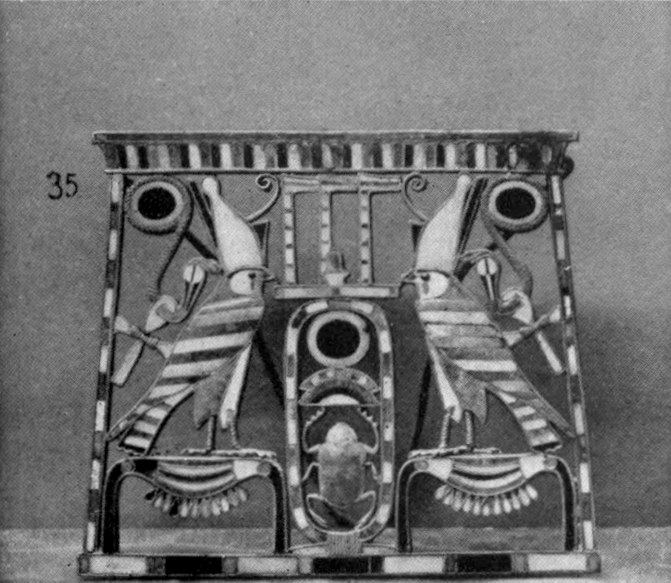
12th dynasty pectoral, featuring twice a combination of the Horus falcon with the gold hieroglyph

One of the older uses of the gold hieroglyph is for the Horus-of-Gold, G8 name. Also known as the Golden Horus Name, this form of the pharaoh's name typically featured the image of a Horus falcon perched above /or beside the hieroglyph for gold.

The meaning of this particular title has been disputed. One belief is that it represents the triumph of Horus over his uncle Seth, as the symbol for gold can be taken to mean that Horus was "superior to his foes". Gold also was strongly associated in the ancient Egyptian mind with eternity, so this may have been intended to convey the pharaoh's eternal Horus name.

Similar to the Fivefold Titulary Nebty name, this particular name typically was not framed by a cartouche or serekh. It always begins with the depiction of the horus falcon perched above a representation of the sun-(hieroglyph).N5

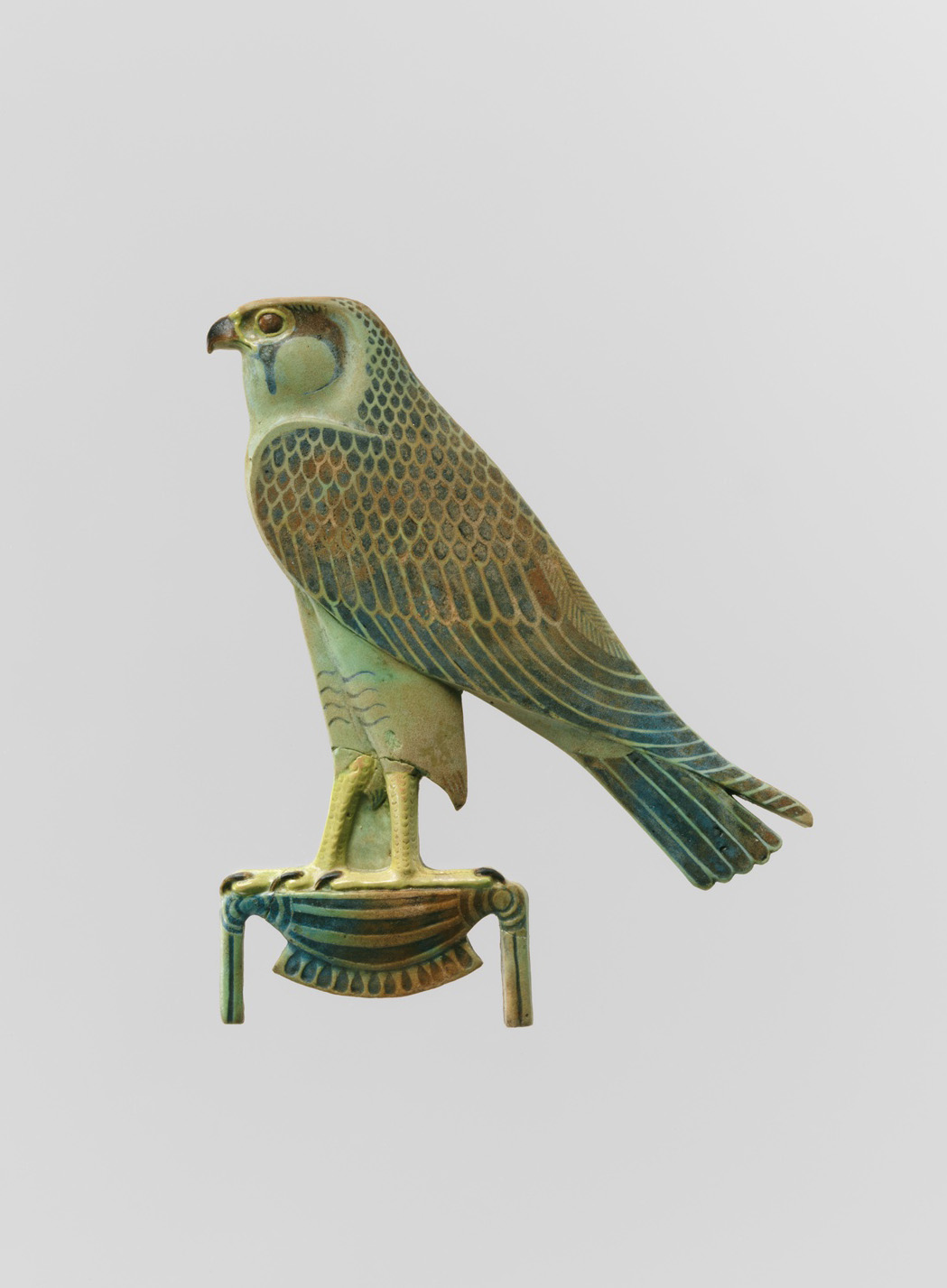
Inlay depicting "Horus as Gold", 30th Dynasty, reign of Nectanebo II, Metropolitan Museum of Art

The combination of the Horus falcon and the gold hieroglyph is frequently found on Ancient Egyptian pectorals (see image).

In Middle Egyptian, the hieroglyph for nebu isS12
It was sometimes followed by the goddess determinative:I12This changed its meaning to "the Golden One", an epithet of Hathor.

The ancient Egyptian name for the city of Ombos, Nebet, also used the nebu hieroglyph.

=== Gold ===
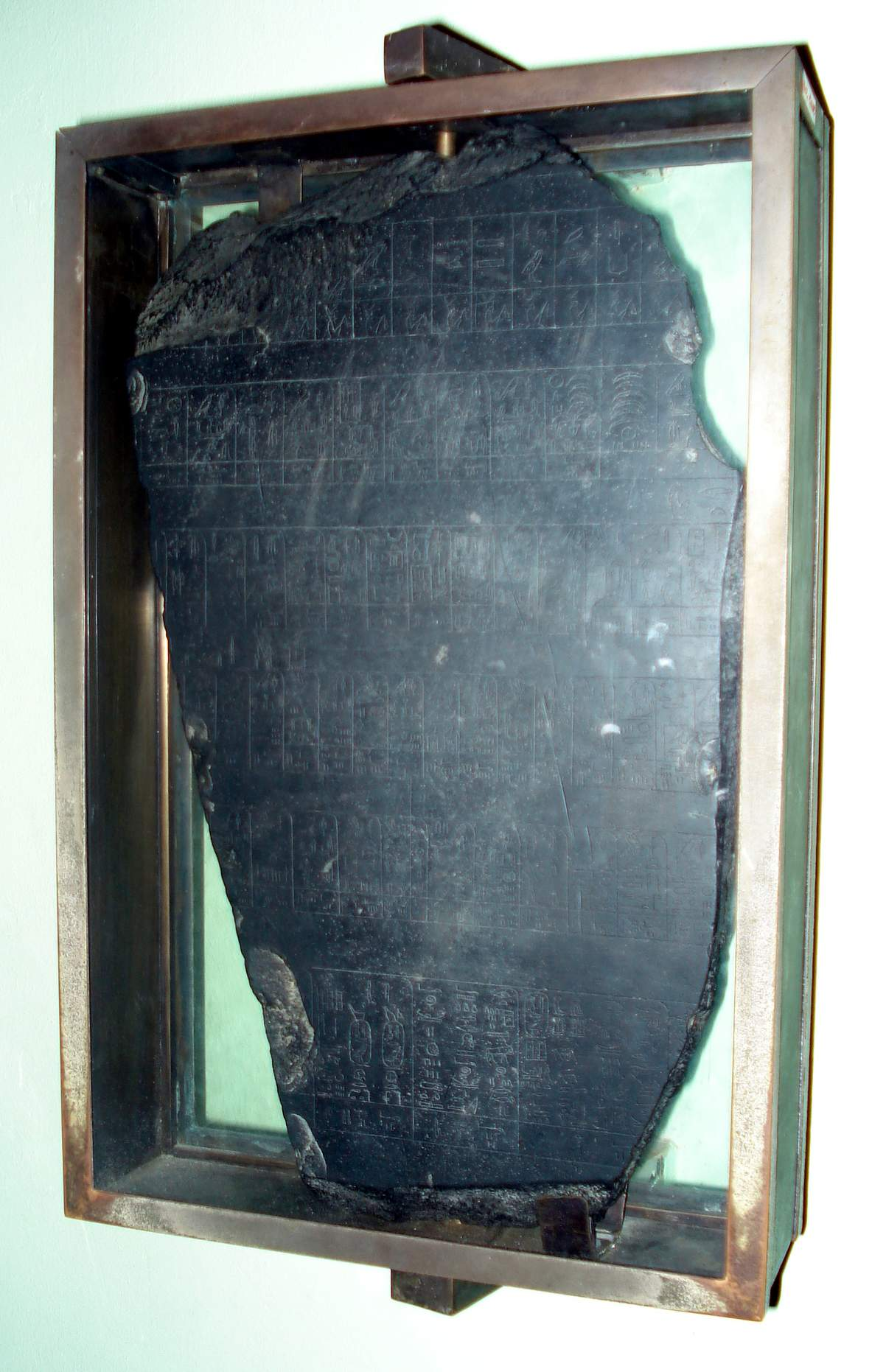
The Palermo piece of the 7-piece Palermo Stone. (Obverse)

In the Old Egyptian Palermo Stone inscription (late 24th or early 23rd century BC), the hieroglyph is used in the phrases "first counting of gold" and "collar of gold".

One spelling of the word "gold", nbw, in the Egyptian language, uses the melted nugget determinative,

N33B

(a small circle), and the plural strokes (3-strokes).

=== Late Period coinage ===
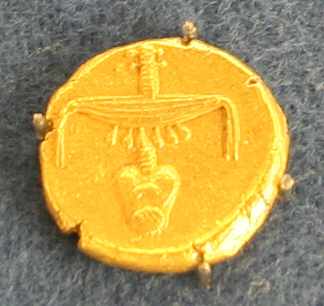
Gold stater of Nectanebo II; Perfect Gold, or Fine Gold.

One of the few coins minted for ancient Egypt is the gold stater, issued during the 30th Dynasty. The reverse of the gold stater shows a horse reared up on its hind legs. The obverse has the two hieroglyphs for nfr and nb: "Perfect gold", or a common-era term: 'Fine'-gold.

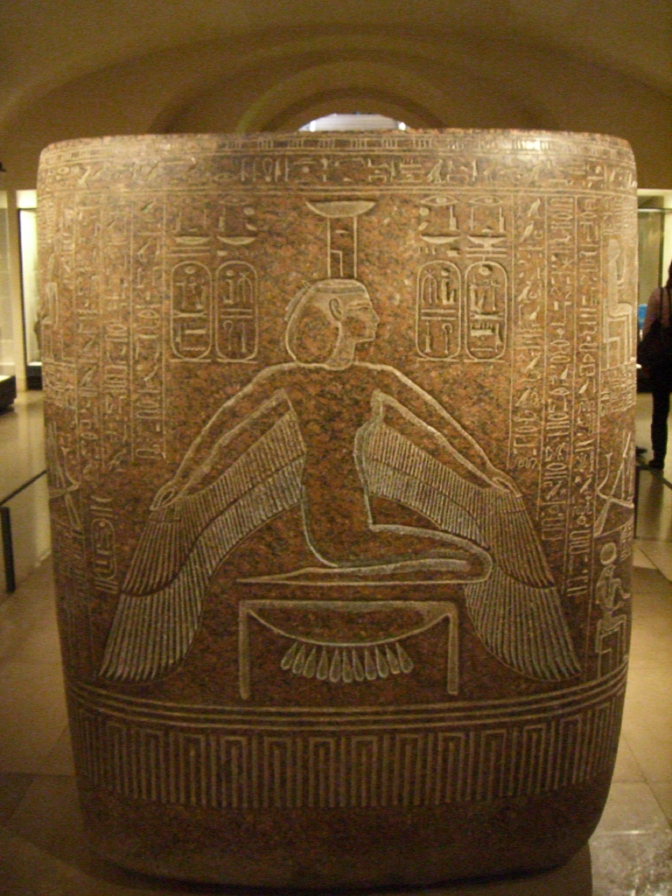
Goddess Nephthys upon the Gold hieroglyph, sarcophagus of Ramesses III

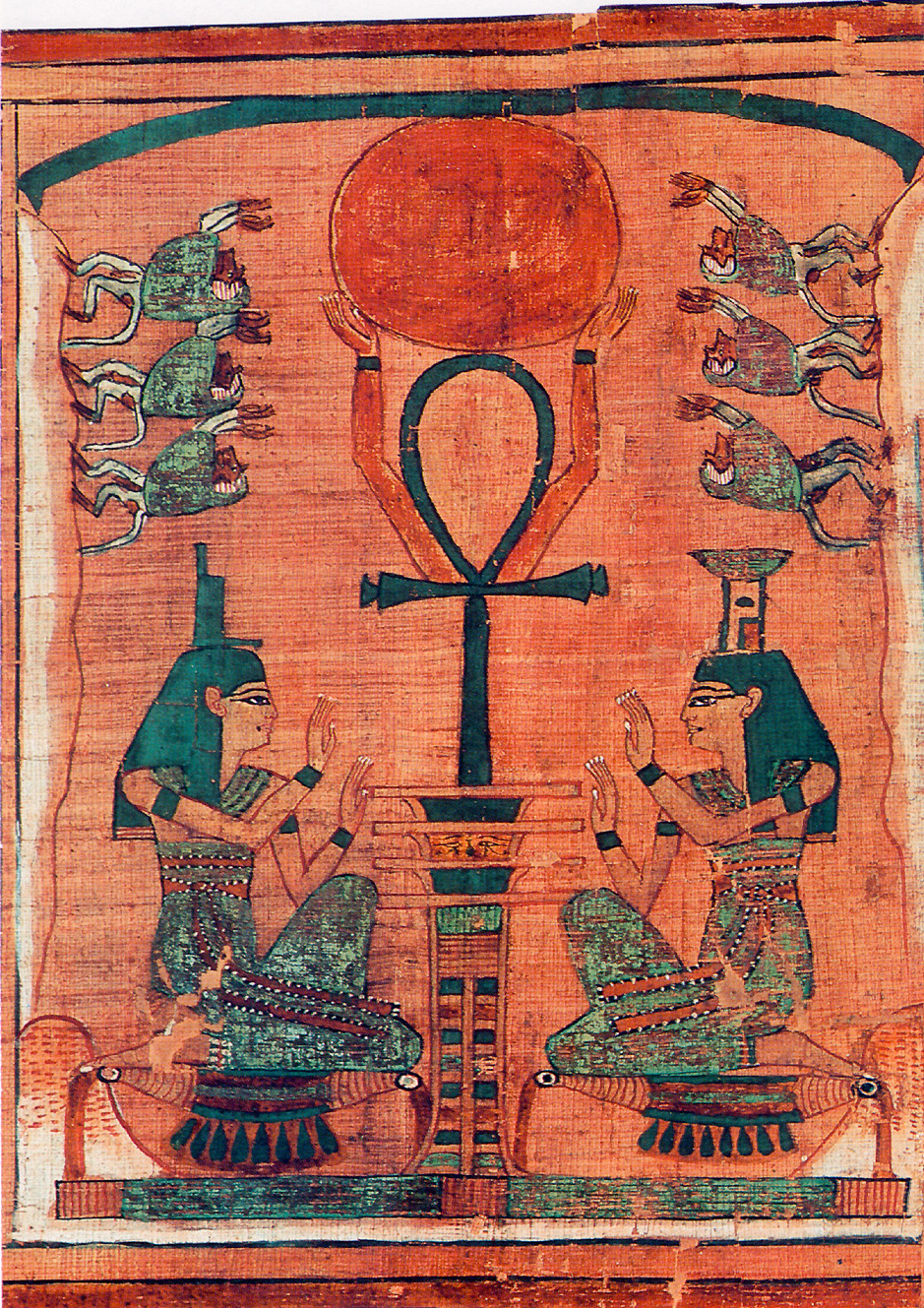
Book of the Dead detail, goddesses on gold, with djed pillar, ankh, Ra, and baboons

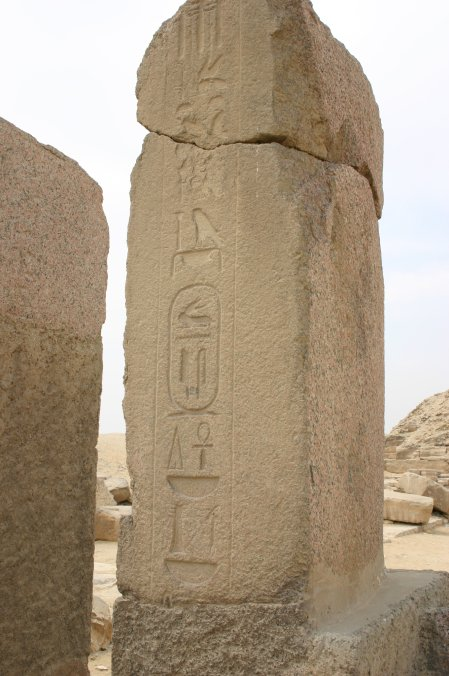
Columnar stele with Unas cartouche

== See also ==
- Gardiner's Sign List#S. Crowns, Dress, Staves, etc
- List of Egyptian hieroglyphs
