= Battle of Pelusium (373 BC) =

373 BC battle to restore Egypt to Persian rule

Battle of Mendes
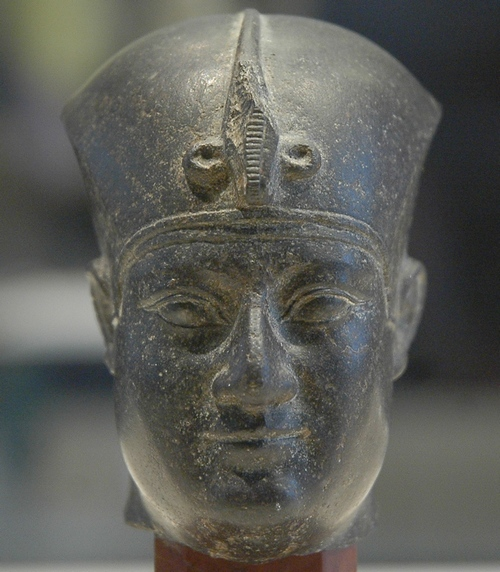
- Statue of Nectanebo I
Date	373 BC
Location	Mendes and Pelusium
Result	Egyptian victory

Belligerents
Egypt	(Achaemenid Empire) Achaemenid Empire; Greek mercenaries

Commanders and leaders
Nectanebo I	Artaxerxes II; Pharnabazus II

Strength
Unknown	220,000 Persian and Greek soldiers 500 warships

The Battle of Pelusium (373 BC) or the Battle of Mendes took place after the Persian king Artaxerxes II launched an attack on Egypt with the aim of restoring Egypt to Persian rule. The campaign failed, and ended with the defeat of the Persians and their Greek mercenaries.

== Background ==
In 525 BC, a Persian force led by Cambyses II invaded Egypt. This force was able to enter Memphis, but could not control all of Egypt. So Cambyses II sent his forces to occupy Siwa Oasis. This force became known as the Lost Army of Cambyses. Cambyses was also unable to occupy much of Upper Egypt and Nubia. Over time, the Persians gained control of most of the populated regions with Egypt effectively becoming a Persian satrapy. This situation lasted until 404 BC when an Egyptian uprising, led by an Egyptian prince called Amyrtaeus was able to achieve independence. However, the native rulers were generally weak leading to disputes between royal princes. Nectanebo I became the first king of the 30th dynasty, after he was able to wrest the Egyptian throne from the last king of the 29th dynasty (Nepherites II). In the meantime, the Persians sought to reconquer Egypt. They tried to invade Egypt in 385 BC and again in 383 BC, but failed. The Persian King Artaxerxes was aware of the turmoil in Egypt between royal family members, so planned another invasion aimed at restoring Egypt to Persian rule. As part of that plan, Artaxerxes concluded a peace treaty with the Athenians. Under this treaty, Egypt lost a valuable ally.

After King Artaxerxes concluded his peace treaty with the Athenians, the Persians gathered a large fleet of 500 ships in Phoenician ports and at Acre, including many Greek mercenaries. In 373 BC, the Persian force of 220,000 soldiers led by the Athenian general Iphicrates and the Persian satrap Pharnabazus then sailed and marched to Gaza.

== The battle ==
The Persians marched from Gaza to Pelusium (Port Said) and attacked the town. However, the Egyptians succeeded in defending the town. Fortifications on the Pelusiac branch of the Nile ordered by Nectanebo forced the enemy fleet to seek another way to sail up the Nile. Eventually the fleet managed to find its way up the less-defended Mendesian branch. However, the mutual distrust that had arisen between Iphicrates and Pharnabazus prevented the enemy from reaching Memphis. Nectanebo I then took advantage of the annual Nile floods to counter-attack. The flooding of the Nile and the Egyptian defenders' resolve to defend their territory hindered the movement of the Persians and Greeks forces and they were defeated and withdrew from Egypt.

== See also ==
- Military of Ancient Egypt
- Egyptian Army
