= Egyptian gold stater =

First coin minted in ancient Egypt

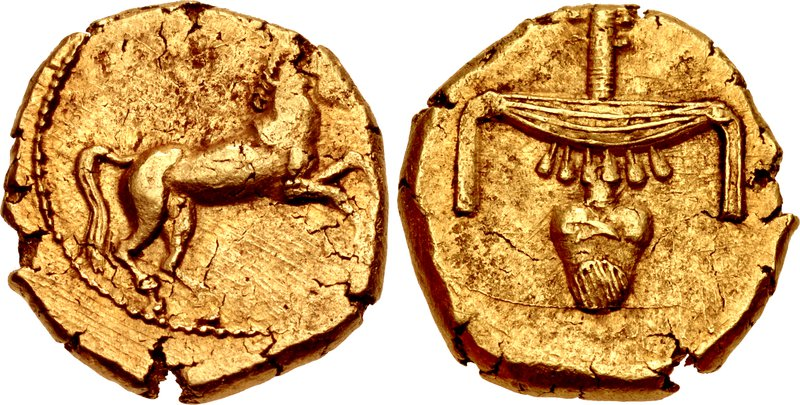
Gold stater of Nectanebo II: reverse with hieroglyphs nfr-nb

The gold stater (Egyptian: 𓄤𓋞 nfr-nb, "Nefer-nub", meaning "fine gold") was the first coin ever minted in ancient Egypt, around 360 BC during the reign of pharaoh Teos of the 30th Dynasty.

== Under Teos ==
Teos introduced the gold stater in order to pay salaries of Greek mercenaries who were at his service.

- Gold stater with the same weight of a Persian daric (around 8.42 grams), with an owl on the left, modelled after the Athenian model, and a papyrus on the right.
- Gold stater as a tetradrachm, with an owl on the left and an olive branch on the right, with the Demotic writing "Teos... Pharaoh".

== Under Nectanebo II ==
Teos' successor Nectanebo II kept this practice, though coining his personal gold staters.

- Gold stater as a daric (about 8.42 grams, a little over 1/4 troy ounce), obverse with a prancing horse on the right, reverse with the hieroglyphs nfr-nb.
  - Nefer depicts a heart and trachea; it means "perfect, complete, good."
  - Nub depicts a gold necklace whose ends drape off either side and six pearl pendants dangling from the middle; it means "gold."
- Small gold stater (about 2.56 grams, 1/12 troy ounce; diameter 14–15 mm, 0.6 inch), with a probable picture of a leaping gazelle. Its attribution to Nectanebo II, however, is not confirmed.

== See also ==
- Egyptian pound
- Ptolemaic coinage

== Sources ==
- Ernst Gölitzer, Entstehung und Entwicklung des alexandrinischen Münzwesens von 30 v. Chr. bis zum Ende der julisch-claudischen Dynastie. Akademie-Verlag, Berlin 2004, ISBN 3-05-004089-0, p. 6.
