= Behbeit El Hagar =

Village in Gharbia Governorate, Egypt

Behbeit El Hegara بهبيت الحجارة
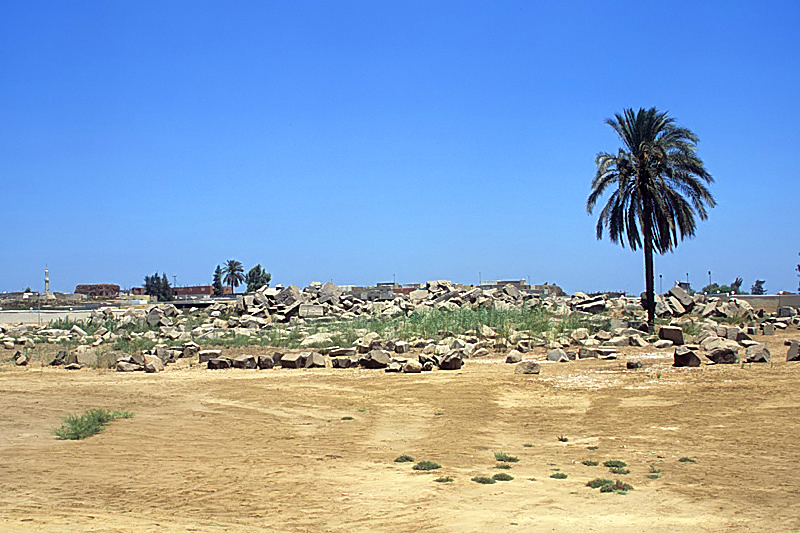
- View of the temple site

- Location in Egypt
- Coordinates: 31°01′40″N 31°17′15″E
- Country: Egypt
- Governorate: Gharbia
- Time zone: UTC+2 (EET)
  - Summer (DST): UTC+3 (EEST)

Behbeit El Hagar (Ancient Egyptian: Pr-ḥꜣbyt(.t), lit. 'house of festival hall', Coptic: ⲡⲁⲃⲁⲓⲧ/ⲡⲁϩⲃⲁⲓⲧ, Ancient Greek: Πααβηιθις) is a village and an archaeological site in Lower Egypt that contains the remains of an ancient Egyptian temple to the goddess Isis, known as the Iseion. The village and the site lie in Gharbia Governorate along the Damietta branch of the Nile, 7 kilometers (4.5 mi) northeast of Sebennytos and 8 kilometers (5 mi) west of Mansoura. In ancient times it was part of the nome of Sebennytos, the Twelfth Lower Egyptian Nome. Ancient Egyptian texts refer to the site as early as the New Kingdom (c. 1550–1070 BC), but it may have been simply an offshoot of Sebennytos rather than a full-fledged town.

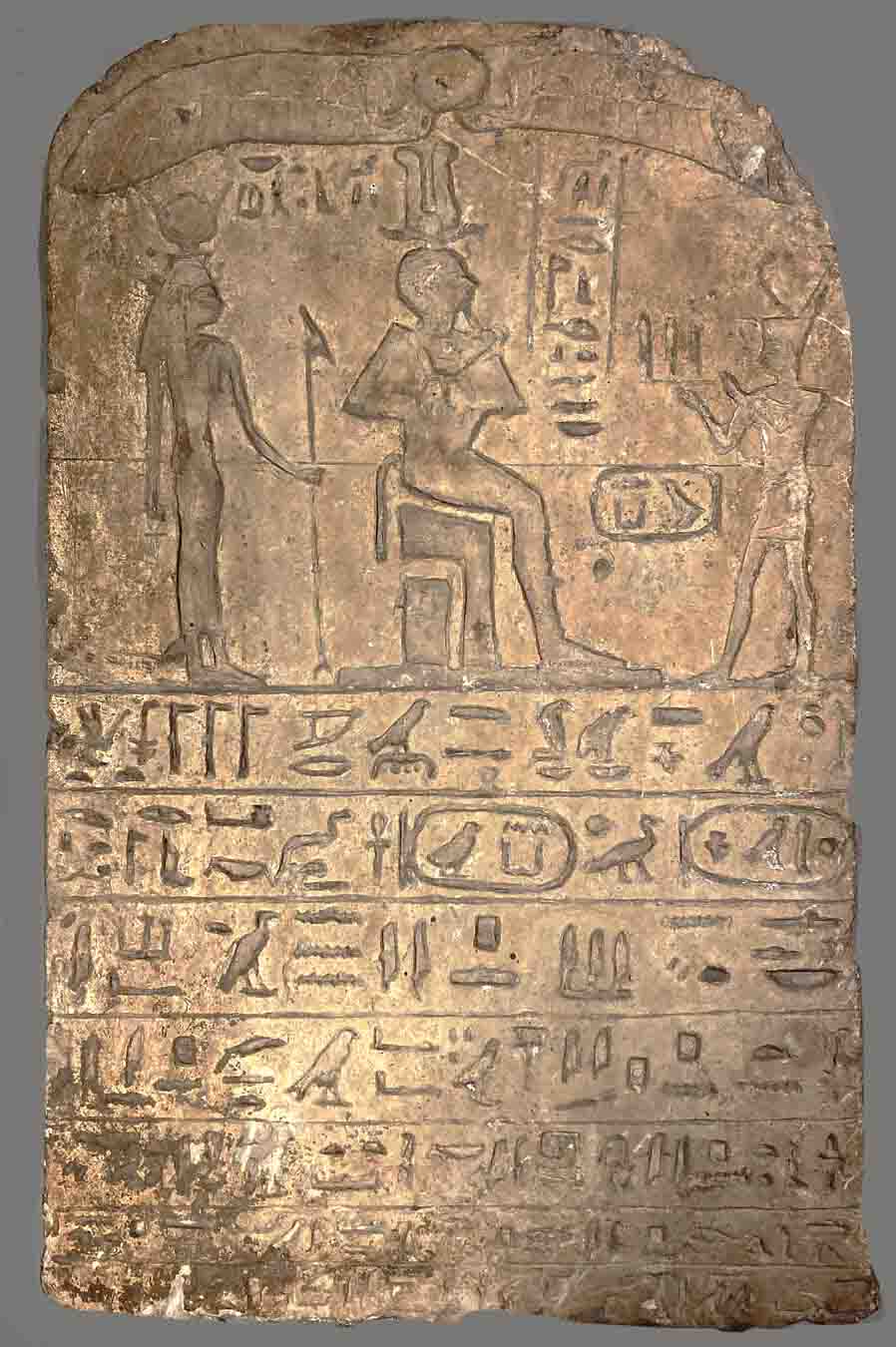
A stele from Behbeit El Hagar recording the donation of land. From the reign of Necho II; at the top, the king brings offerings to the seated god Osiris, and the goddess Isis. Louvre Museum

Sources as early as the Pyramid Texts, in the Fifth Dynasty indicate that Isis was connected with the region of Sebennytos, and she and her cult may have originated there. However, major temples were not dedicated to her until the Thirtieth Dynasty, when her temples at Philae and at Behbeit El Hagar began construction. The two temples paralleled each other, with Philae serving as Isis's main cult center in Upper Egypt and Behbeit El Hagar as its Lower Egyptian counterpart.

The Iseion was begun in the reign of Nectanebo II (360–342 BC) and completed in the reign of Ptolemy III (r. 246–222 BC). Whereas most Egyptian temples were built primarily of limestone or sandstone, with harder stones such as granite used only for individual elements such as statues, obelisks, or doorways, the temple at Behbeit El Hagar was built entirely of granite. The temple was demolished at some point, possibly in ancient times, by an earthquake or by the removal of its stone to serve as building material. Only scattered blocks remain there today.

pr Z1 W4 b i i niwt pr ḥbj(t) in hieroglyphs Era: 3rd Intermediate Period (1069–664 BC)	H b i i W4 t niwt or H b W4 niwt ḥbj(t) in hieroglyphs	pr Z1 W4 t niwt pr ḥbj in hieroglyphs Era: Ptolemaic dynasty (305–30 BC)

== Archaeological finds ==
In 2026, rescue excavations conducted by Egypt’s Supreme Council of Antiquities uncovered the remains of two colossal royal statues. The first statue was identified as Ramesses II, who ruled during the 13th century BCE. Its surviving head, measuring approximately 1.6 metres in height, depicts the pharaoh wearing the double crown of Upper and Lower Egypt. Based on the dimensions of the head, archaeologists estimate that the complete statue originally stood about 8.5 metres (28 feet) tall, including its base. The second statue, preserved to a length of approximately 2.4 metres, may also represent Ramesses II, although its identification remains uncertain. Excavators additionally recovered a pink granite block bearing hieroglyphic inscriptions containing two of the pharaoh’s royal titles.

== See also ==
- List of ancient Egyptian sites, including sites of temples
