= Tjahapimu =

4th-century BC Egyptian prince, general and regent

- Prince and Regent of Egypt
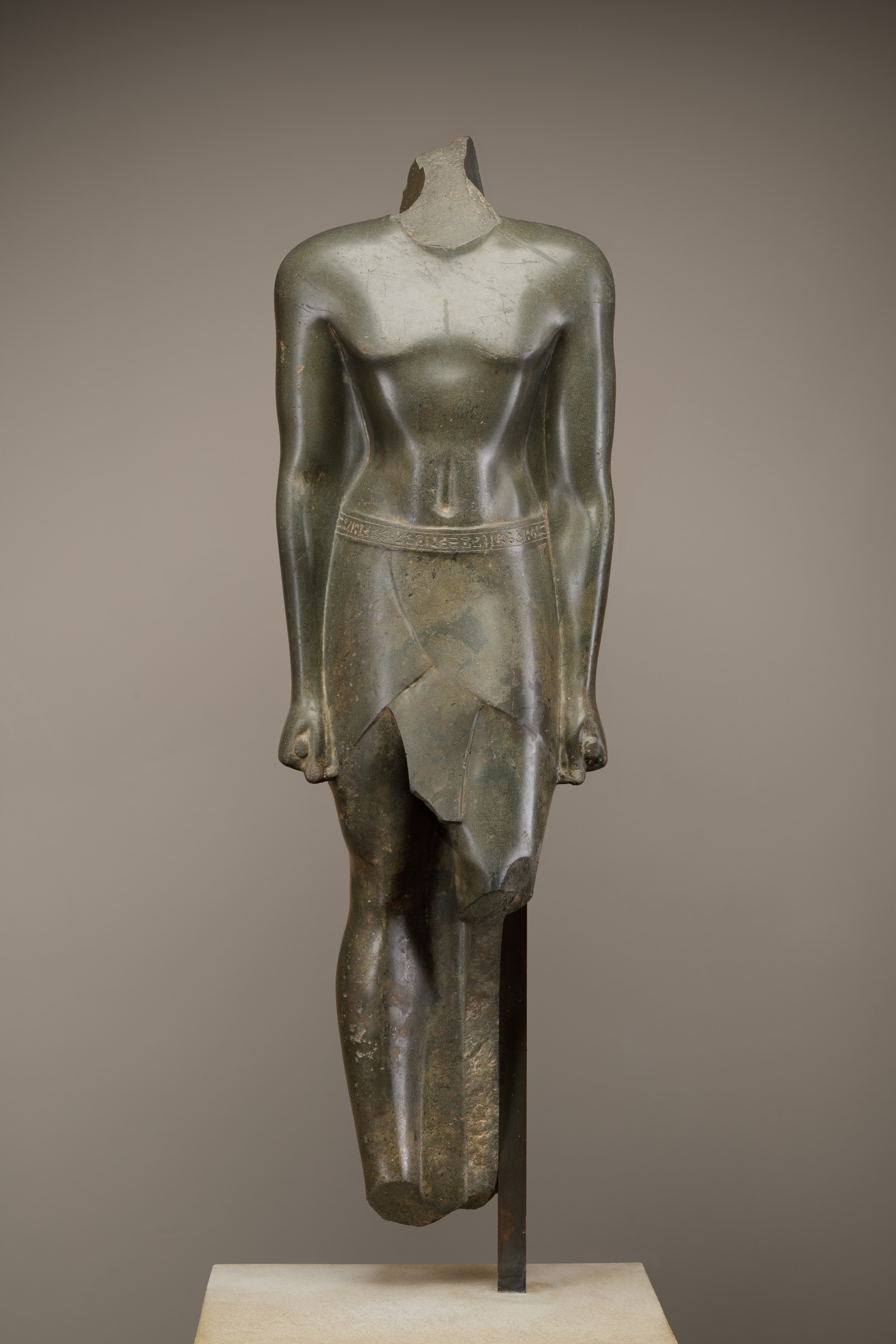
- Statue of Tjahapimu. MMA, New York.
- Dynasty: 30th Dynasty
- Pharaoh: Teos
- Father: possibly Nectanebo I
- Children: Nectanebo II

Tjahapimu or Tjahepimu, (fl. c.360 BCE) was an ancient Egyptian prince, general and regent during the 30th Dynasty.

== Biography ==
Tjahapimu is archaeologically attested by statue made from meta–greywacke which was unearthed at Memphis and is now exhibited at the Metropolitan Museum of Art, New York. On the statue, he is called "Brother of the King" and "Father of the King"; while there is no doubt that the latter title refers to his son Nectanebo II, the former one is still matter of debate. Two differing interpretations identified Tjahapimu's brother with either pharaoh Teos (thus being both sons of Nectanebo I) or Nectanebo I (in this case Tjahapimu would be Teos' uncle).

In any case, when Teos went to the Near East leading a military expedition against the Achaemenid Empire, he left Tjahapimu in Egypt as his regent. However, Tjahapimu took advantage of Teos' unpopularity in Egypt, which was due to the harsh tax regime that the pharaoh imposed in order to finance his expedition. Tjahapimu convinced his own son Nakhthorheb (the future Nectanebo II), who was serving Teos as the commander of the machimoi, to rebel against him and to rise as pharaoh himself. His plan was successful: Nakhthorheb was acclaimed pharaoh and Teos fled at Susa to the court of the Great King.
