= Nectanebo I =

4th-century BC Egyptian pharaoh

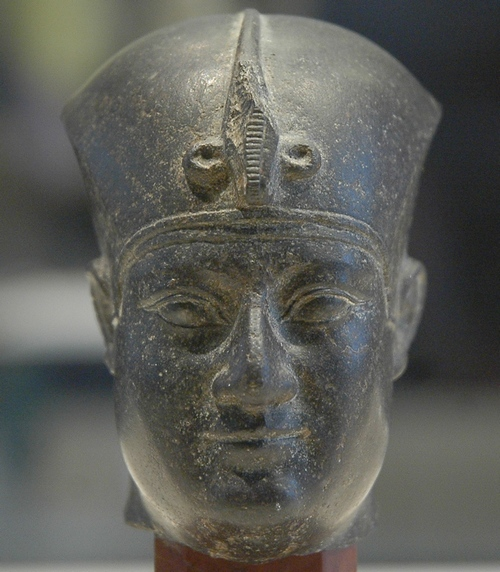
- Statue of Nectanebo I with khepresh crown

Pharaoh
- Reign: 379/378–361/360 BC
- Predecessor: Nepherites II (29th Dynasty)
- Successor: Teos
Royal titulary
Horus name
Tjemaa
Ṯm3ˁ
He whose arm is strong
G5	V13 U2 D36
Nebty name
Semenkhtawy
Smnḫ-t3wj
He who makes the two lands admirable
G16	O34 mn n Aa1 U22 N19
Golden Horus
Irimeretnetjeru
Jrj-mrt-nṯrw
He who does what the gods love
G8 D4 Z1 R8 Z1 R8 Z1 R8 U6
Titulary of Nectanebo from the Temple of Atum at Heliopolis
Prenomen
Kheperkare
Ḫpr-k3-Rˁ
The manifestation of the Ka of Ra

M23 X1 L2 X1	N5 L1 D28
Nomen
Nakhtnebef
Nḫt nb.f
The strong one of his lord

G39 N5	n M3 Aa1 t D40 V30 f
- Children: Teos, Tjahapimu
- Father: Djedhor
- Mother: unknown
- Dynasty: 30th Dynasty

Nectanebo I (Egyptian: Nḫt-nb.f; Ancient Greek: Νεκτάνεβις Nectanebis; died 361/360 BC) was an ancient Egyptian pharaoh, founder of the last native dynasty of Egypt, the 30th.

== Name ==
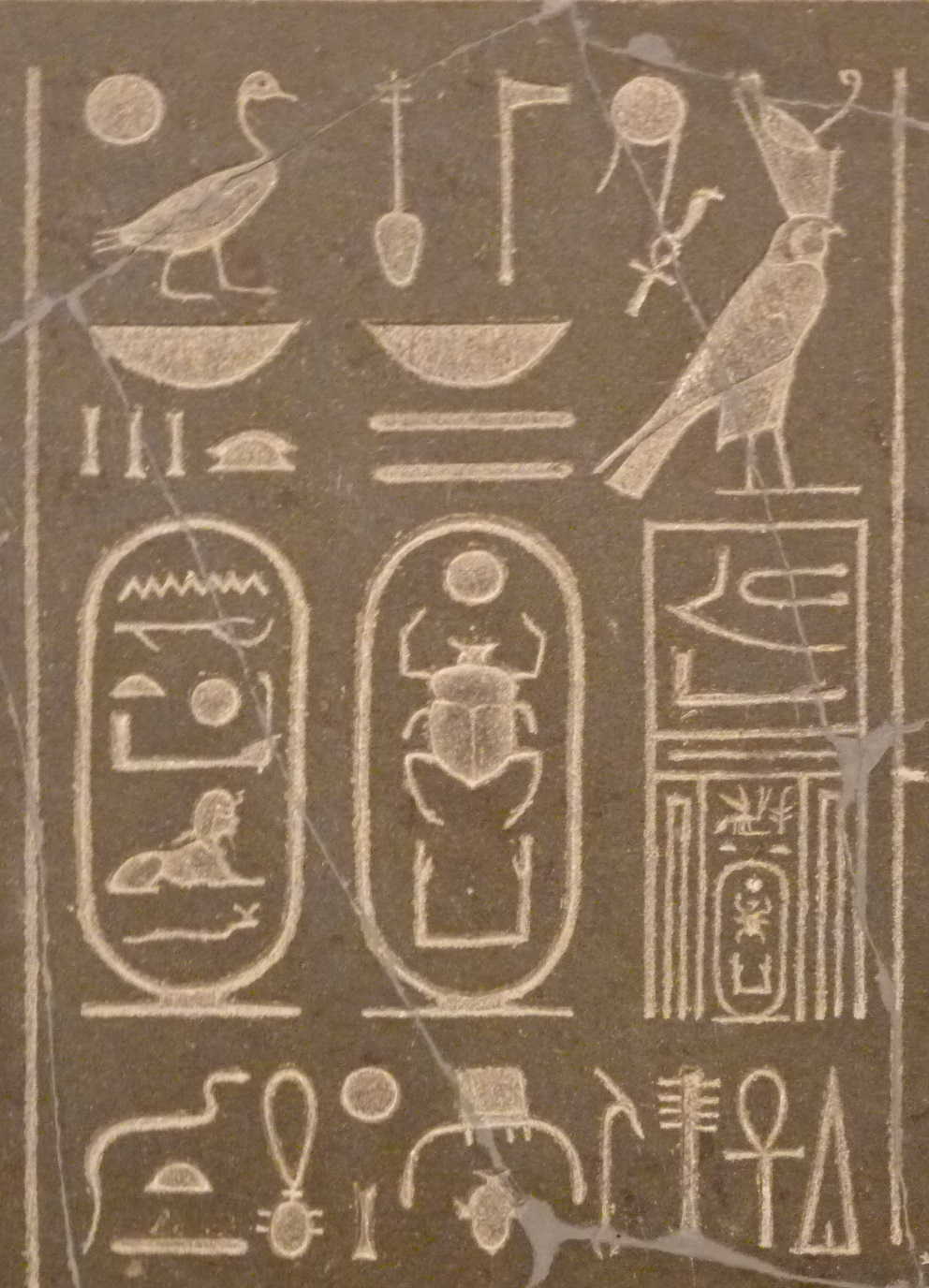

Nectanebo's Egyptian personal name was Nḫt-nb.f (Nakhtnebef), which means "the strong one of his lord". Greek sources rendered the name as Νεκτάνεβις (Nectanebis). The writings of Manetho which have been preserved by George Syncellus spell it Νεκτανέβης (Nectanebēs), but this is probably only based on a phonetic approximation due to iotacism. Although convention in English assigns identical names to him and his grandson, Nectanebo II, the two in fact had different names.

== Reign ==
=== Accession and family ===
Nectanebo was an army general from Sebennytos, son of an important military officer named Djedhor and of a lady whose name is only partially recorded, [...]mu. A stele found at Hermopolis provides some evidence that he came to power by overthrowing, and possibly putting to death, the last pharaoh of the 29th Dynasty Nepherites II. It has been suggested that Nectanebo was assisted in the coup by the Athenian general Chabrias. Nectanebo carried out the coronation ceremony in c. 379/378 BC in both Sais and Memphis, and shifted the capital from Mendes to Sebennytos.

The relationships between Nectanebo and the pharaohs of the previous dynasty are not entirely clear. He showed little regard for both Nepherites II and his father Achoris, calling the former inept and the latter a usurper. He seemed to have had a higher regard for Nepherites I, who was formerly believed to be Nectanebo's father or grandfather, although it is now believed that this view was due to a misinterpretation of the Demotic Chronicle. However, it has been suggested that both Achoris and Nectanebo may have been Nepherites I's relatives in some way.

Nectanebo had two known sons: Teos, who was his appointed successor, and Tjahapimu.

=== Activities in Egypt ===
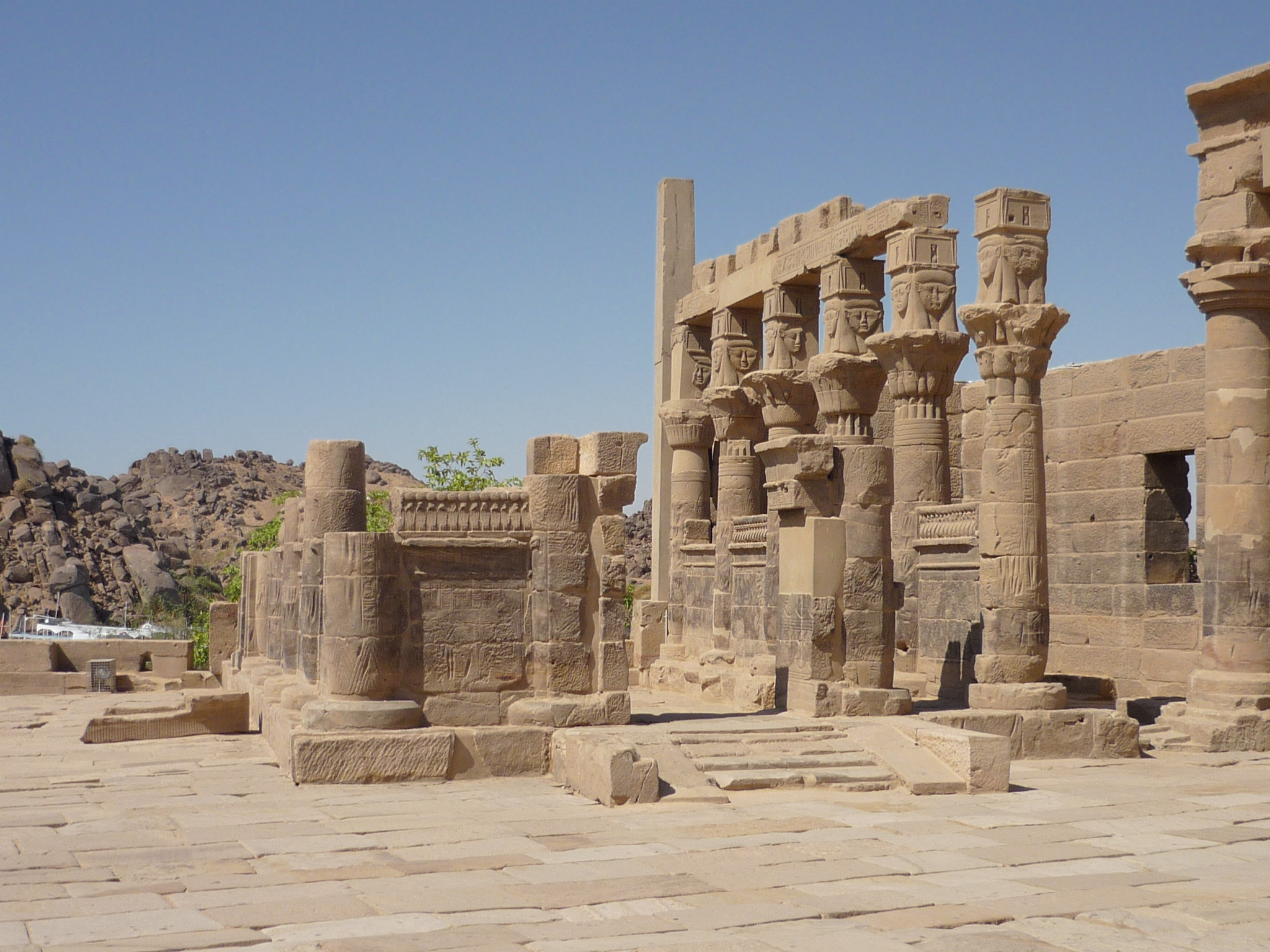
Vestibule of the Temple of Isis at Philae

Nectanebo was a great builder and restorer, to an extent not seen in Egypt for centuries. He ordered work on many of the temples across the country.

On the sacred island of Philae near Aswan, he began the temple of Isis, which would become one of the most important religious sites in ancient Egypt, by erecting its vestibule. Nectanebo also began the First Pylon in the Precinct of Amun-Re at Karnak, and it is believed that the earliest known mammisi, which was found at Dendera, was built by him. The cult of sacred animals, which became prominent between the two Persian occupation periods (the 27th and 31st dynasties respectively), was supported by Nectanebo as evidenced by archaeological findings at Hermopolis, Hermopolis Parva, Saft el-Hinna and Mendes. Further works ordered by the pharaoh have been found in religious buildings at Memphis, Tanis and El Kab.

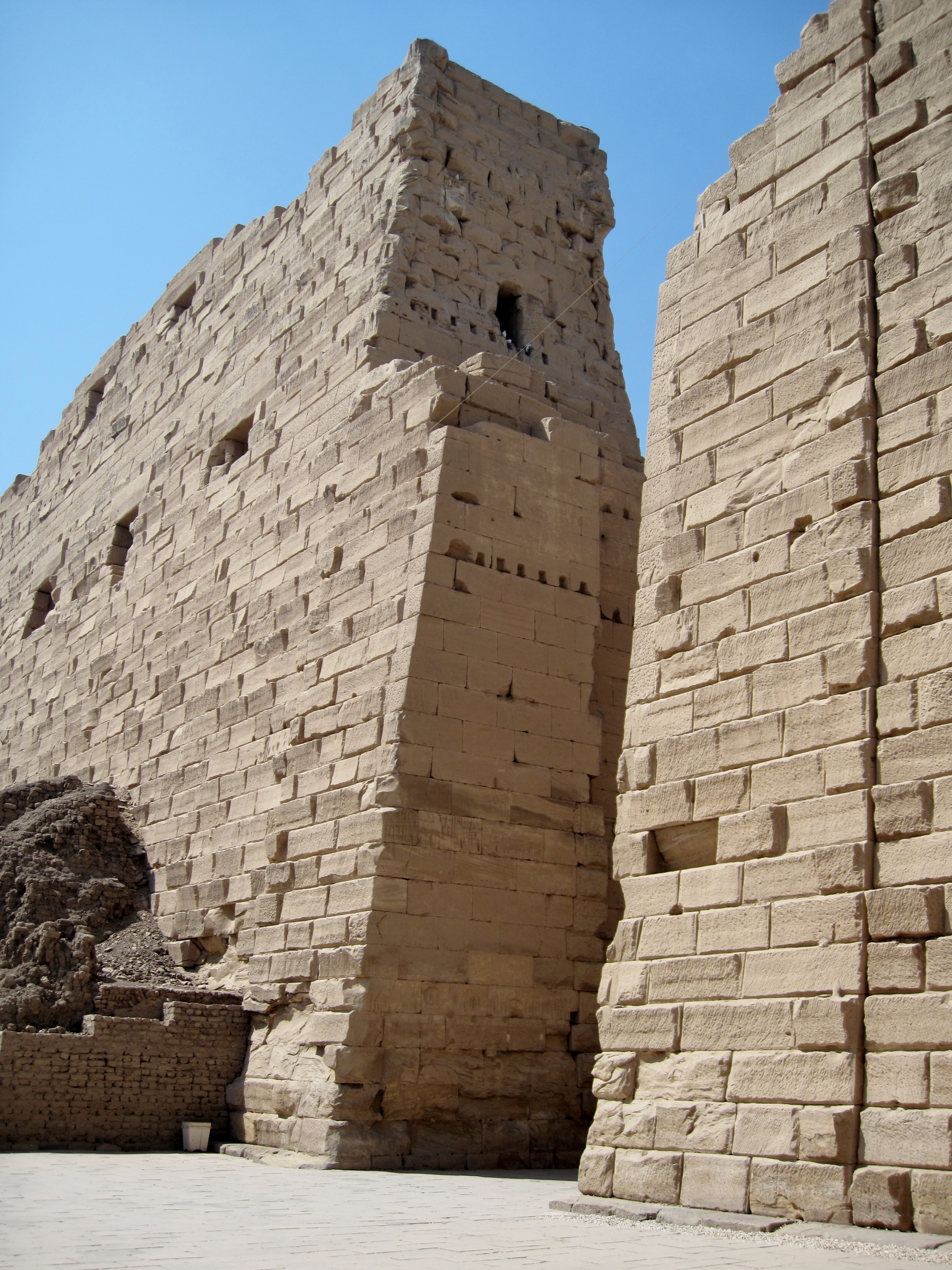
First Pylon, Karnak

Nectanebo was also generous towards the priesthood. A decree dated to his first year and discovered on a stele at Naucratis, required that 10 percent of taxes collected both from imports and from local production in this city were to be used for the temple of Neith at Sais. A twin of this stele was recently discovered in the now-submerged city of Heracleion. The aforementioned stele from Hermopolis, placed before a pylon of Ramesses II, lists the donations made by Nectanebo to the local deities, and other benefits were also granted to the priesthood of Horus at Edfu. Nectanebo's prodigality showed his devotion to the gods and at the same time financially supported the largest holders of wealth of the country and for expenditure on the defence of the country.

=== Defeating Persian invasion ===
In 374/373 BC Nectanebo had to face a Persian attempt to retake Egypt, which was still considered by the Achaemenid king Artaxerxes II nothing more than a rebel satrapy. After a six-year preparation and applying pressure on Athens to recall the Greek general Chabrias, Artaxerxes dispatched a great army led by the Athenian general Iphicrates and the Persian Pharnabazus. It has been recorded that the army was composed of over 200,000 troops, including Persian soldiers and Greek mercenaries, and around 500 ships. Nectanebo ordered fortifications built along the Pelusiac branch of the Nile, compelling the enemy fleet to find its way up the less-defended Mendesian branch.

At this point, the mutual distrust that had arisen between Iphicrates and Pharnabazus prevented the enemy from reaching Memphis. Then the annual Nile flood and the Egyptian defenders' resolve to defend their territory turned what had initially appeared as certain defeat for Nectanebo I and his troops into a complete victory.

From 368 BC many western satrapies of the Achaemenid Empire started to rebel against Artaxerxes II, so Nectanebo provided financial support to the rebelling satraps and re-established ties with both Sparta and Athens.

== Succession ==
Nectanebo died during his 19th year as ruler. His tomb, sarcophagus and mummy have never been found. Towards the end of his reign (in Year 16 – 364/363 BC), probably to remedy the dynastic problems that plagued his predecessors, Nectanebo restored the long-lost practice of the co-regency, associating his son Teos to the throne. However, shortly after Teos' accession, his brother Tjahapimu betrayed him and managed to put his own son Nakhthorheb (Nectanebo II) onto the Egyptian throne.

Preceded by Nepherites II	Pharaoh of Egypt; 379/8–361/0	Succeeded by Tachos
