= Teos of Egypt =

4th century BC Egyptian pharaoh

Teos
- Djedhor, Djedher, Tachos, Takhos
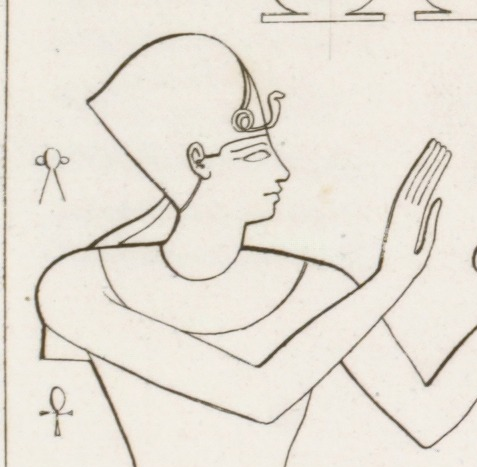
- Drawing of a relief of pharaoh Teos with khepresh crown

Pharaoh
- Reign: 361/0–359/8 BCE
- Coregency: Three years with Nectanebo I
- Predecessor: Nectanebo I
- Successor: Nectanebo II
Royal titulary
Horus name
Khaemmaat Seshemtawy
ḫ3j-m-M3ˁt-sšm-t3wj
Who appears as Maat, Leader of the Two Lands
G5	N28 G17 C10 T32 N19
Nebty name
Merymaat Sahperunetjeru
Mrj-M3ˁt-s3ḫ-prw-nṯrw
G16	C10 U6 i i s Aa1 G25 R8A O1 O1 O1
Golden Horus
Khubaqet Wafkhasut
ḫwj-b3qt-w3f-ḫ3swt
The ruling king who destroys foreign countries
G8	Aa1 D43 Z7 Z4 D58 N29 t D10 O49 G45 f N25 N25 N25
Prenomen
Irimaatenre
Jrj-m3ˁt-n-Rˁ
Carrying out the Justice of Ra

M23 X1 L2 X1	N5 D6 U4 t D36 n
Nomen
Djedhor Setep-en-inhuret
Ḏd Ḥr stp n jnj ḥrt
Horus Says [he will live], Chosen of Anhur

G39 N5	W25 N1 A40 I10 D2 Z1 U21 n
- Children: Khedebneithirbinet II(?)
- Father: Nectanebo I
- Dynasty: 30th Dynasty

Djedhor, better known as Teos (Ancient Egyptian: Djedhor) or Tachos (Ancient Greek: Τάχως), was an ancient Egyptian pharaoh of the 30th Dynasty. He was the co-ruler with his father, Nectanebo I, from around 365 BC, he served as regent alongside his father for approximately three years to ensure a smooth transition of power. Upon his father's death, Teos inherited a wealthy and independent Egypt.

== Biography ==
A son of his predecessor Nectanebo I, Teos was his co-regent for three years before ascending to the throne in 361–60 BCE.

=== Expedition against Persians ===
Nectanebo's success in the Nile Delta against the invading Persian armies in 374–73 BCE encouraged Teos to start to plan a military expedition into Palestine and Phoenicia, which were territories controlled by the Persians. Taking advantage of a moment of weakness for the Achaemenid Empire due to riots in some satrapies in Asia Minor, Teos sought assistance from both the octogenarian king Agesilaus II of Sparta and the Athenian general Chabrias, including a number of mercenaries and 200 triremes, from Greece. However, to finance such an expedition, Teos had to impose new taxes and to expropriate the goods of the temples, destroying the delicate balance artfully established by his father Nectanebo. This action ensured to Teos both the required finances and a great unpopularity.

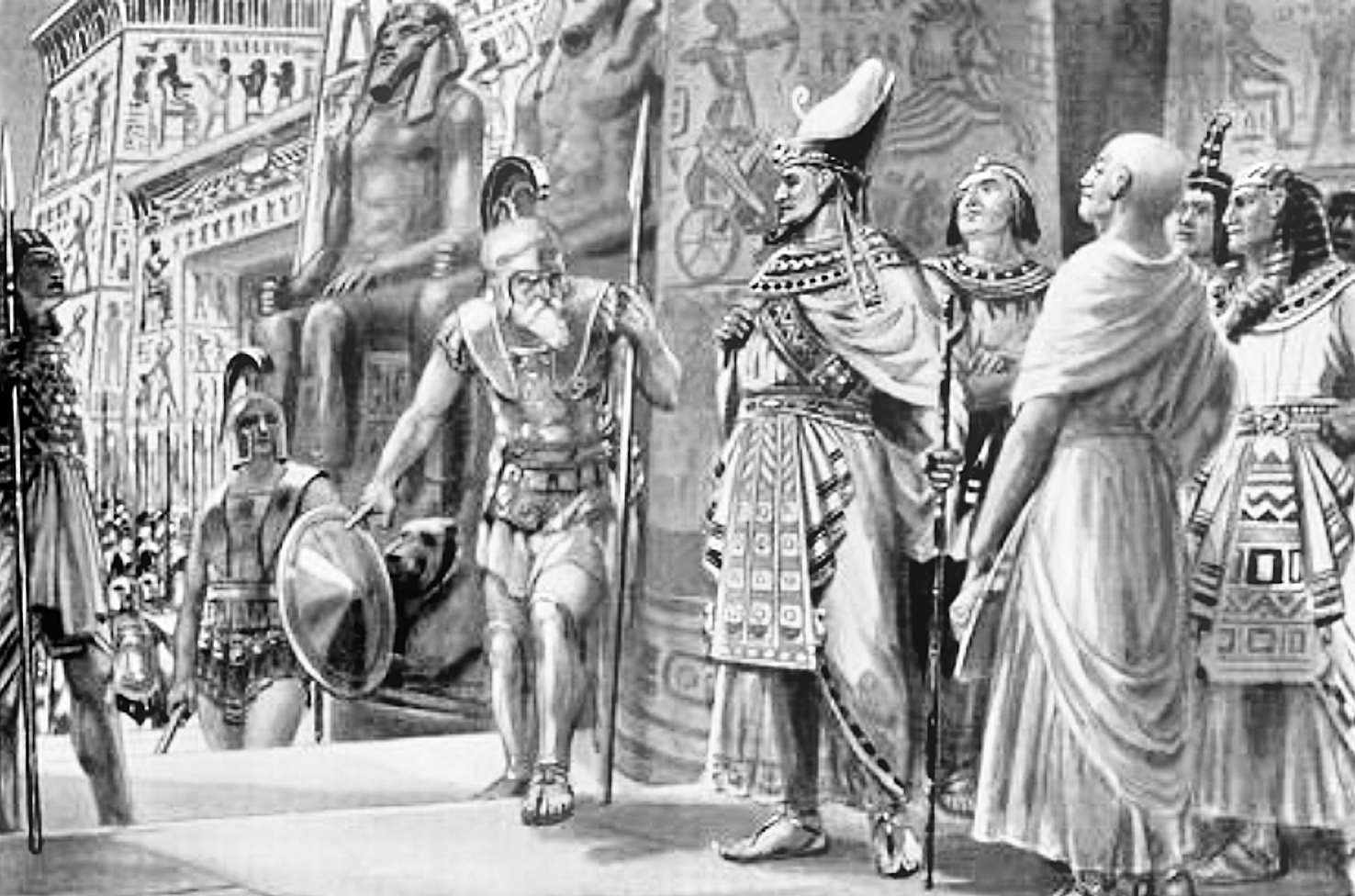
The Spartan king Agesilaus offers his services to Teos, Egypt 361 BCE.

The operation against the Persians started with Chabrias as the admiral of the fleet, Agesilaus as the commander of the Greek mercenaries and Teos's nephew Nakhthorheb as the leader of the machimoi (Diodorus Siculus, certainly exaggerating, claimed that the machimoi were 80,000 in number). Teos placed himself in the supreme command of the expedition (the position claimed by Agesilaus) leaving his brother Tjahapimu, the father of Nakhthorheb, in Egypt as his regent. The expedition made its way to Phoenicia without particular problems.

=== Betrayal and end ===
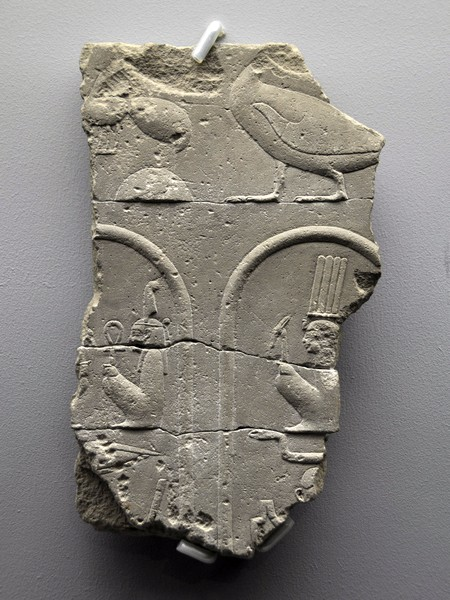
Teos, cartouche fragment

Unfortunately for Teos, his brother Tjahapimu was plotting against him. Taking advantage of Teos's unpopularity, and with the support of the priestly classes, Tjahapimu convinced his son Nakhthorheb to rebel against Teos and to make himself pharaoh. Nakhthorheb persuaded Agesilaus to join his side by taking advantage of the several disagreements that had arisen between the Spartan king and the pharaoh. Nakhthorheb was acclaimed pharaoh – better known today as Nectanebo II – and the betrayed Teos had no alternative but to flee to Susa, the court of his enemies.

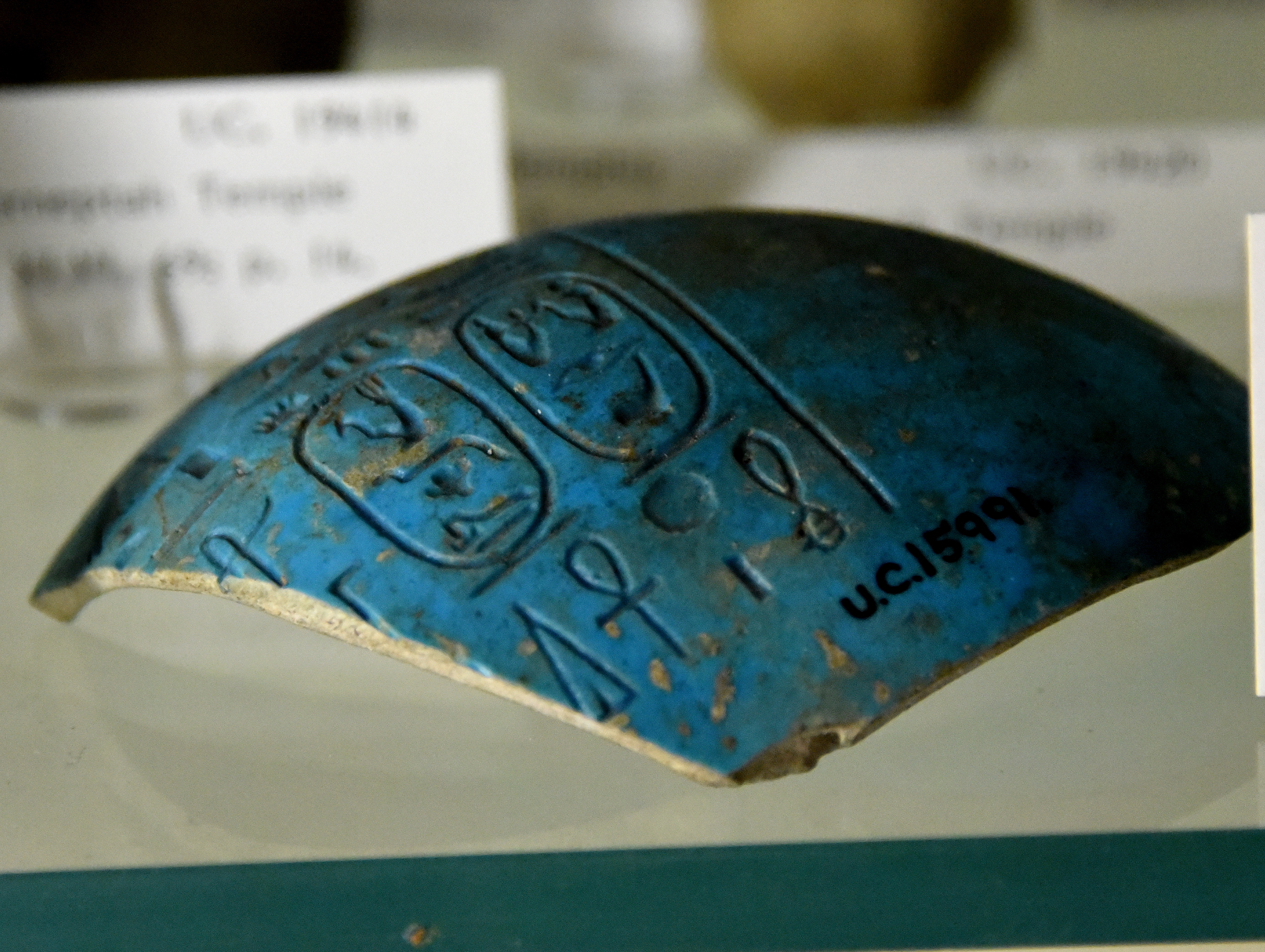
Fragment of a faience saucer inscribed with the name of Teos. The Petrie Museum of Egyptian Archaeology, London

Knowledge of the final fate of Teos comes from the inscription by a noble called Wennefer, who also participated in Teos's unfortunate expedition as a physician. Wennefer was sent by Nectanebo II in search of Teos and managed to have him held by the Persian king Artaxerxes II at Susa. Wennefer then had Teos brought back with him in chains to the Egyptian pharaoh. Whatever happened to Teos afterwards has been lost to time.

== Bibliography ==
- Depuydt, Leo (2006). "Saite and Persian Egypt, 664 BC - 332 BC". In Hornung, Erik; Krauss, Rolf; Warburton, David A. (eds.). Ancient Egyptian Chronology. Brill, Leiden/Boston. pp. 265–283. ISBN 978-90-04-11385-5.
- Dodson, Aidan; Hilton, Dyan (2004). The Complete Royal Families of Ancient Egypt. London: Thames & Hudson Ltd. ISBN 0-500-05128-3.
- Grimal, Nicolas (1992). A History of Ancient Egypt. Oxford: Blackwell Books. ISBN 9780631174721.
- Lloyd, Alan B. (1994). "Egypt, 404–322 B.C.". In Lewis, D.M.; Boardman, John; Hornblower, Simon; et al. (eds.). The Cambridge Ancient History (2nd ed.), vol. VI – The Fourth Century B.C. Cambridge University Press. pp. 337–360. ISBN 0-521-23348-8.
- Wilkinson, Toby (2010). The Rise and Fall of Ancient Egypt. London: Bloomsbury. ISBN 978-1-4088-10026.
- Gauthier, Henri (1915). "De la XXVe dynastie à la fin des Ptolémées". Le livre des rois d'Égypte, (in French). Le Caire: De L’Institut Français D’Archeologie oriantale, Tome IV. pp. 182–183.

Preceded by Nectanebo I	Pharaoh of Egypt; Thirtieth Dynasty	Succeeded by Nectanebo II
