= Nectanebo II =

Last native Egyptian pharaoh

- Nakhthorheb
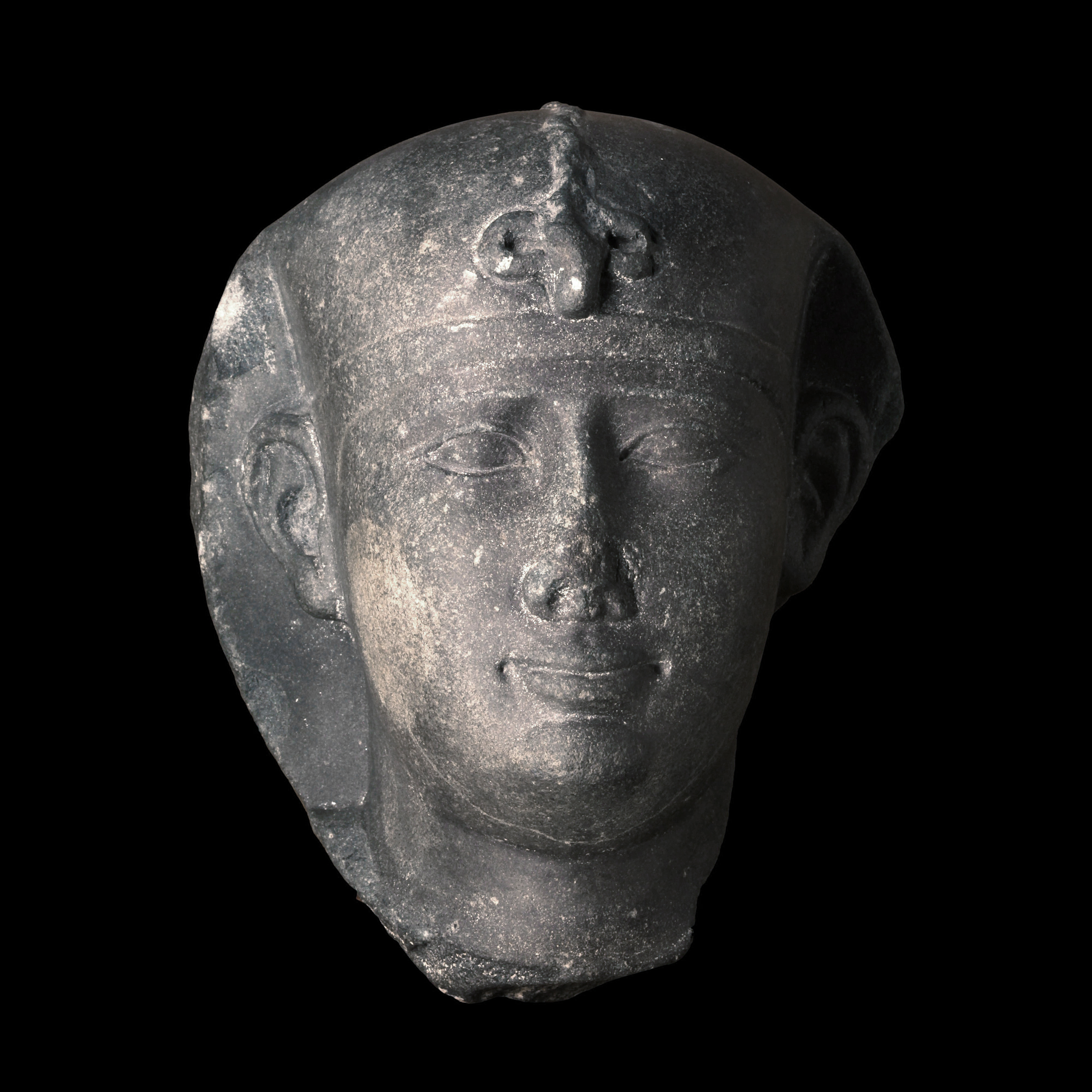
- Head of Nectanebo II, Museum of Fine Arts of Lyon

Pharaoh
- Reign: 358–c.340 BC
- Predecessor: Teos
- Successor: Artaxerxes III
Royal titulary
Horus name
Mrj-tꜣwj
Merytawy
Beloved by the Two Lands
G5	U6 N19
Nebty name
Shrw-jb-nṯrw
One who contents the Heart of Gods
G16	s h r F34 R8 G43
Golden Horus
Smn-hpw
Creator of Laws
G8	s mn N35 h p Y1 Z7 Z2
Prenomen
Snedjemibre Setepenanhur
Pleasing to the Heart is Ra, chosen of Onuris

M23 X1 L2 X1	C1 C9 s nDm ib Z1 U21 n
Nomen
Nḫt Ḥr n ḥbt mrj Ḥtḥr
Nakhthor(en)hebit Meryhathor
Strong is Horus of Hebit, the beloved of Hathor

G39 N5	C9 mr D40 G5 W4 t O49
- Consort: Khedebneithirbinet II (?)
- Father: Tjahapimu
- Born: c. 380 BC
- Died: After 340 BC
- Dynasty: Thirtieth Dynasty

Nectanebo II (Egyptian: Nḫt-Ḥr-Ḥbt; Ancient Greek: Νεκτανεβώς Nectanebos) was the last native ruler of ancient Egypt, as well as the third and last pharaoh of the Thirtieth Dynasty, reigning from 358 to c.340 BC.

During the reign of Nectanebo II, Egyptian artists developed a specific style that left a distinctive mark on the reliefs of the Ptolemaic Kingdom. Like his indirect predecessor Nectanebo I, Nectanebo II showed enthusiasm for many of the cults of the gods within ancient Egyptian religion, and more than a hundred Egyptian sites bear evidence of his attention.

For several years, Nectanebo II was successful in keeping Egypt safe from the Achaemenid Empire. However, he was betrayed by his former servant, Mentor of Rhodes, and ultimately defeated. The Achaemenids occupied Memphis and then seized the rest of Egypt, incorporating the country into the Achaemenid Empire under Artaxerxes III. Nectanebo fled south. His subsequent fate is unknown.

== Name ==
Nectanebo is derived from the Greek form of his name, Nectanebōs (Νεκτανεβώς, or Νεκτανεβός in later sources). His Egyptian name was Nḫt-ḥr-Ḥbt (Nakht-hor-hebyt), which means "victorious is Horus of Hebyt". Although convention in English assigns identical names to him and his grandfather, Nectanebo I, the latter was in fact called Nectanebis (Νεκτάνεβις).

Medieval Arab authors referred to him as Nāqāṭānībās (Arabic: ناقاطانيباس).

== Rise to power ==
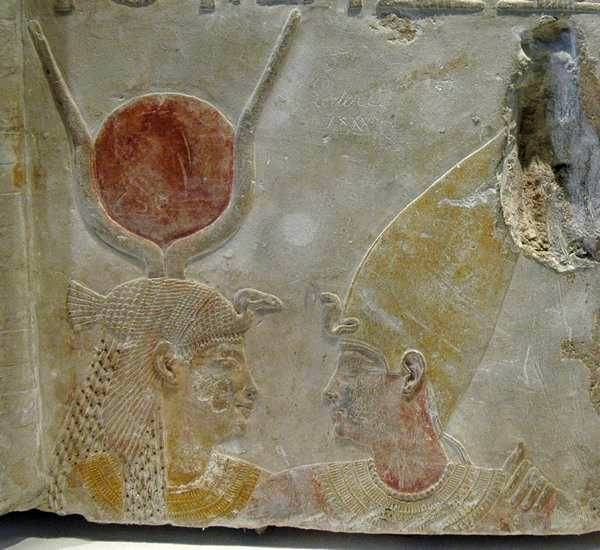
Isis and Nectanebo II

In 525 BC, Egypt was conquered by the Achaemenid Empire. Because of internal struggles for the Persian imperial succession, Egypt managed to regain independence in 404 BC. In 389 BC, Pharaoh Hakor negotiated a treaty with Athens and for three years (from 385 to 383 BC) managed to withstand Persian aggression. However, following the conclusion of the Peace of Antalcidas in 387 BC between the Achaemenids and the Greek city-states, Egypt and Cyprus became the only obstacles to Persian hegemony in the Mediterranean.

At the beginning of 360 BC, Nectanebo's predecessor, Teos, started preparations for war against intruders. In the same year, the Egyptian army set off, traveling along the coast by land and sea. Nectanebo II accompanied his uncle Teos in that campaign and was in charge of the machimoi.

In an attempt to quickly raise finances for the war, Teos imposed taxes on Egyptians and seized temple property. Egyptians, particularly the priests, resented these measures but supported Nectanebo II. Teos asked Spartan military leader Agesilaus and Athenian general Chabrias to support him. Agesilaus, however, said he was sent to aid Egypt and not to wage war against it. Chabrias returned home with his mercenaries. Teos decided to flee to the Achaemenid court, where he ultimately died of natural causes.

Nectanebo contended with an unnamed pretender to the throne from the town of Mendes, who proclaimed himself pharaoh. The revolt was probably led by one of the descendants of Nepherites I, whose family had ruled the town before. The claimant sent messengers to Agesilaus in an attempt to persuade Agesilaus to his side. Agesilaus remained loyal to Nectanebo, fearing to become a turncoat. At one of the towns in the Nile Delta, the troops of Nectanebo and Agesilaus were besieged by the usurper, who had gained many sympathisers. Despite the enemy's numerical superiority, Nectanebo and Agesilaus were victorious and the revolt was put down in the fall of 360 BC.

== Reign ==
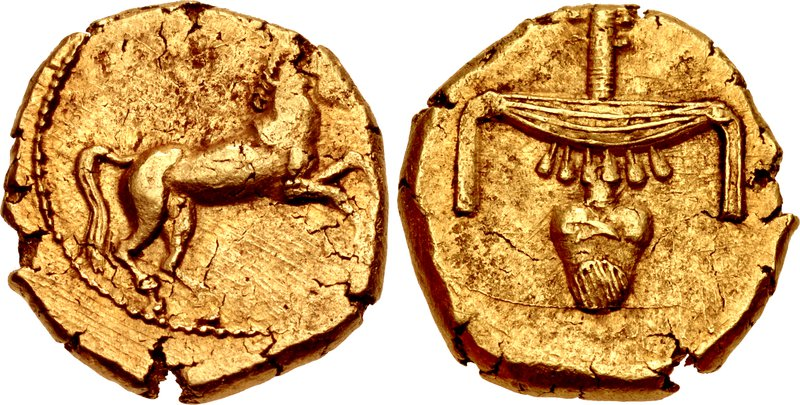
Egyptian gold stater of Nectanebo II. The design on the reverse consists of Egyptian hieroglyphs meaning "good gold": pectoral necklace (nebu, "gold") crossing horizontally over a windpipe and heart (nefer, "good").

Religion played an important part in Nectanebo's domestic policy. He began his reign by officiating over the funeral of an Apis bull in Memphis. There, Nectanebo added a relief decoration to the eastern and western temples of Apis. Among notable sanctuaries erected under Nectanebo II are a temple of Khnum in Abu and a temple of Amun at Sekhtam. He also dedicated a diorite naos to Anhur-Shu (a fragment of it was found in the temples of Tjebnutjer). Nectanebo II was responsible for the increasing popularity of the Buchis cult. Under Nectanebo II a decree forbidding stone quarrying in the so-called "Mysterious Mountains" in Abydos was issued.

Foreign affairs under Nectanebo II were thwarted by repeated Achaemenid attempts to reconquer Egypt. Before the accession of Nectanebo II to the throne, the Persians attempted to reclaim Egypt in 385, 383, and 373 BC. Nectanebo used the peace to build up a new army and employed Greek mercenaries, which was a common practice at the time. In about 351 BC, the Achaemenid Empire embarked on a new attempt to reclaim Egypt. After a year of fighting, Nectanebo and his allied generals, Diophantus of Athens and Lamius of Sparta, managed to defeat the Achaemenids. Having scored a resounding victory, Nectanebo II was acclaimed "Nectanebo the divine falcon" by his people, and cults were set up in his name.

Ushabti of Nectanebo II, Egyptian faience. Museo Egizio, Turin

In 345/44 BC, Nectanebo supported the Phoenician rebellion against the Achaemenid Empire, led by the king of Sidon, Tennes, and dispatched military aid in the form of 4,000 Greek mercenaries, led by Mentor of Rhodes. However, having heard of the approach of the forces of Artaxerxes III, Mentor opened communication with the Persians in collusion with Tennes.

At the end of 344 BC, ambassadors of Artaxerxes III arrived in Greece, asking for the Greeks' participation in a campaign against Egypt. Athens and Sparta treated the ambassadors with courtesy, but refrained from committing to an alliance against Egypt. Other cities, however, decided to support the Persians: Thebes sent 1,000 hoplites and Argos 3,000.

In the winter of 343 BC, Artaxerxes set off for Egypt. The Egyptian army, headed by Nectanebo, consisted of 60,000 Egyptians, 20,000 Libu, and as many Greek mercenaries. In addition, Nectanebo had a number of flat-bottomed boats intended to prevent an enemy from entering the Nile mouths. The vulnerable points along his Mediterranean sea border and east boundary were protected by strongholds, fortifications and entrenched camps. Persian forces were strengthened by Mentor and his men, well acquainted with the eastern border of Egypt, and by 6,000 Ionians.

Nectanebo II was ultimately defeated and, in the summer of 342 BC, Artaxerxes entered Memphis and installed a satrap. Nectanebo fled to Upper Egypt and finally to Nubia, where he was granted asylum by its king Akhraten. Nectanebo, however, preserved a degree of power there for some time. With the help of Khabash, Nectanebo made a vain attempt to regain the throne.

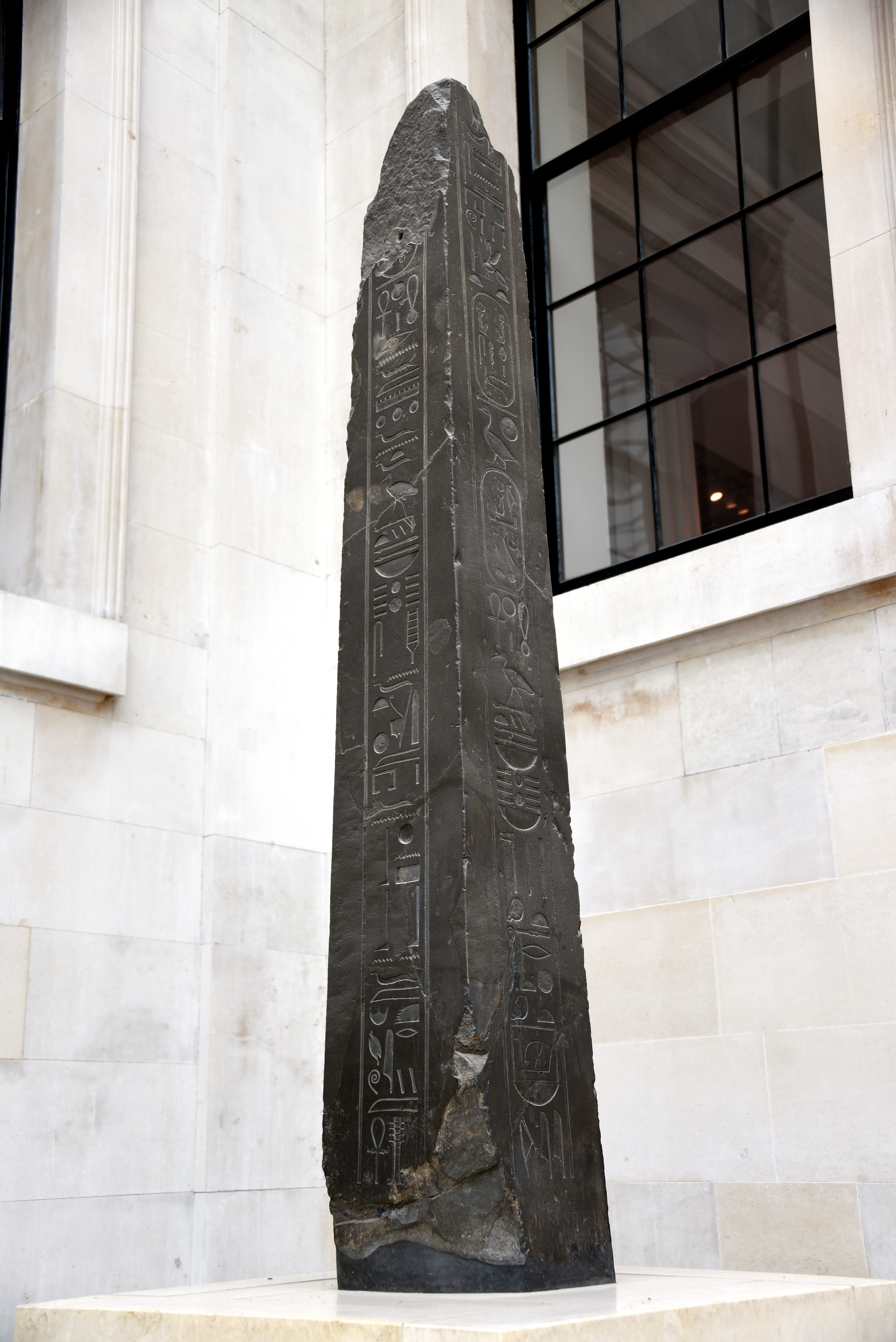
Black siltstone obelisk of Pharaoh Nectanebo II. According to the vertical inscriptions he set up this obelisk at the doorway of the sanctuary of Thoth, the Twice-Great, Lord of Hermopolis. Today, it is located in the British Museum, London.

== Archaeological evidence ==
=== Building campaigns ===
Though placed in an unfortunate period of Egyptian history, and with his legacy perhaps marred by being the last pharaoh to rule an independent Egypt, Nectanebo was an extensive builder, likely on a scale that would equal many kings of the glory days of the New Kingdom. References to either Nectanebo II or his grandfather have been found almost ubiquitously at the premier religious centres, and the piety of the two kings matched those of the great kings of the past, attested to by the numerous monuments across Egypt bearing their names. Nectanebo II, specifically, built and improved temples across the country, and he donated extensively to the priesthoods of the plethora of sites which he donated to. Nectanebo's name has been found at Heliopolis, Athribis, and Bubastis in the Nile Delta, among other places, but he built most extensively at Sebennytos, including the modern site of Behbeit El Hagar. The reliefs of the temples at Sebennytos would leave a distinct mark on the art of the later Ptolemaic Kingdom. The religious focus of his building campaigns, however, may not be solely due to sheer piety; because Nectanebo was an usurper, he likely sought to legitimise his rule over Egypt religiously.

=== Portraits ===
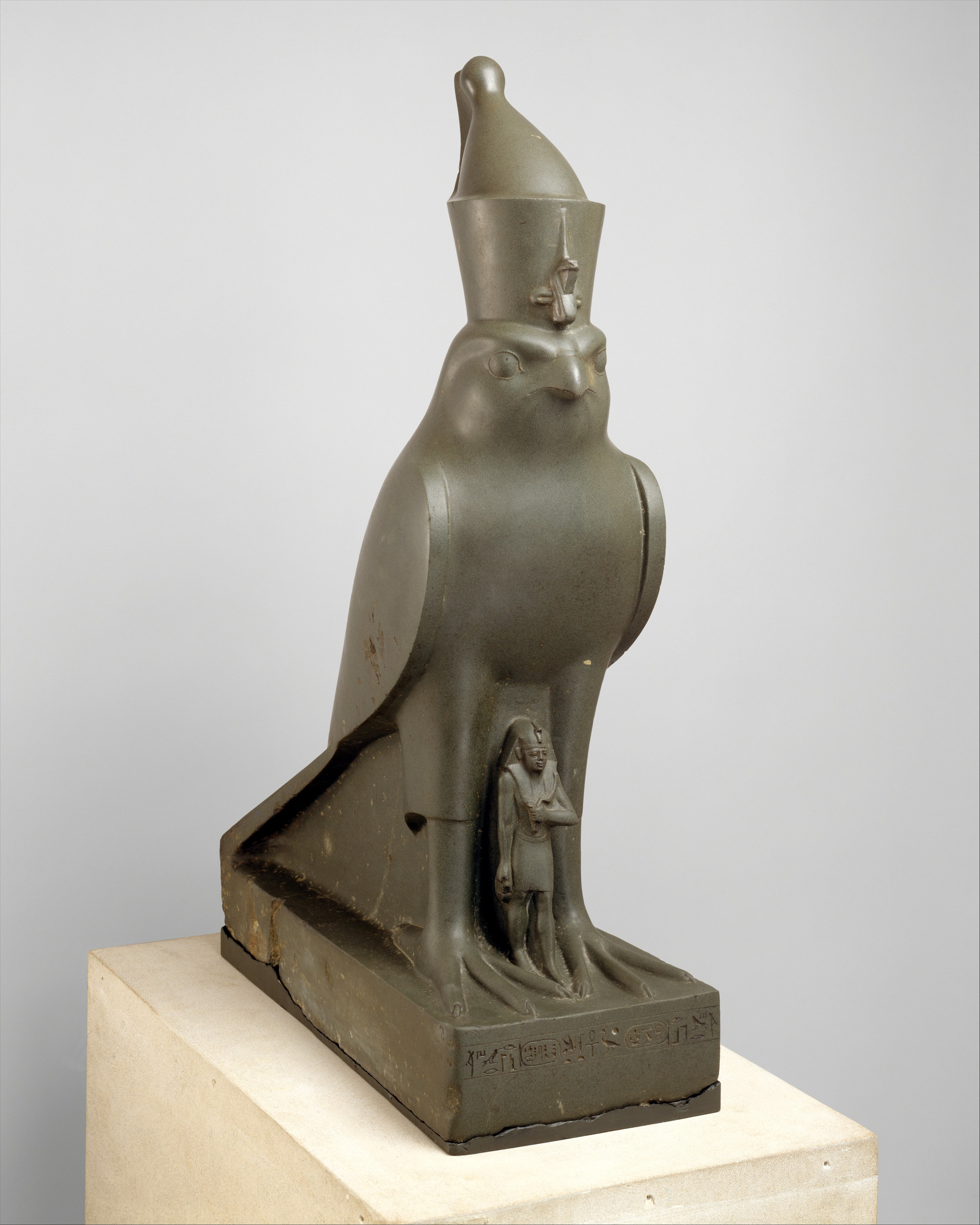
The greywacke statue of Horus protecting Nectanebo II

Except for the small-scale greywacke statue in the Metropolitan Museum of Art, which shows Nectanebo II standing before the image of Horus, no other annotated portraits of Nectanebo II are known. In the greywacke statue, Nectanebo II is shown in a nemes and uraeus. His bent arm with the sword stands for the hieroglyph nakht, the falcon represents Horus, while the hieroglyph in Nectanebo's right hand stands for heb. Other portraits attributed to Nectanebo II (all featuring the khepresh) include a quartzite head in the museum of the University of Pennsylvania Museum of Archaeology and Anthropology, a basalt head in Alexandria, a granite head acquired by the Museum of Fine Arts, Boston and a damaged quartzite head.

== Legacy ==
=== Sarcophagus ===
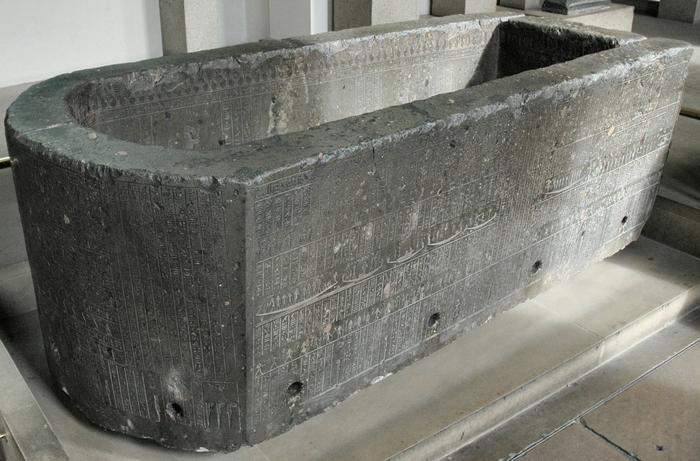
Sarcophagus of Nectanebo II, taken by Napoleon at Alexandria and soon turned over to the British army

In 1798, Napoleon captured the Egyptian city of Alexandria. Soon after, following the Battle of Alexandria in 1801, Napoleon's forces surrendered to the British, and conditionally turned over antiquities they had gathered from the ancient city. Notably, among these was the Rosetta Stone, as well as a seven ton sarcophagus, covered in hieroglyphics. Soon after the British secured these, they were approached by locals who believed that this was the tomb of Alexander the Great. Thereafter, the sarcophagus was taken to London, where it still resides at the British Museum.

For a time, the sarcophagus was believed to have belonged to Alexander. However, after the translation of the Rosetta Stone, the writings on the sarcophagus were deciphered, and it became clear the tomb was not fashioned for him. The hieroglyphics on the tomb were sections from the Book of What is in the Underworld, and contained the cartouche of Nectanebo II. The tomb was likely created for Nectanebo, before going unused as he was overthrown and fled to Nubia.

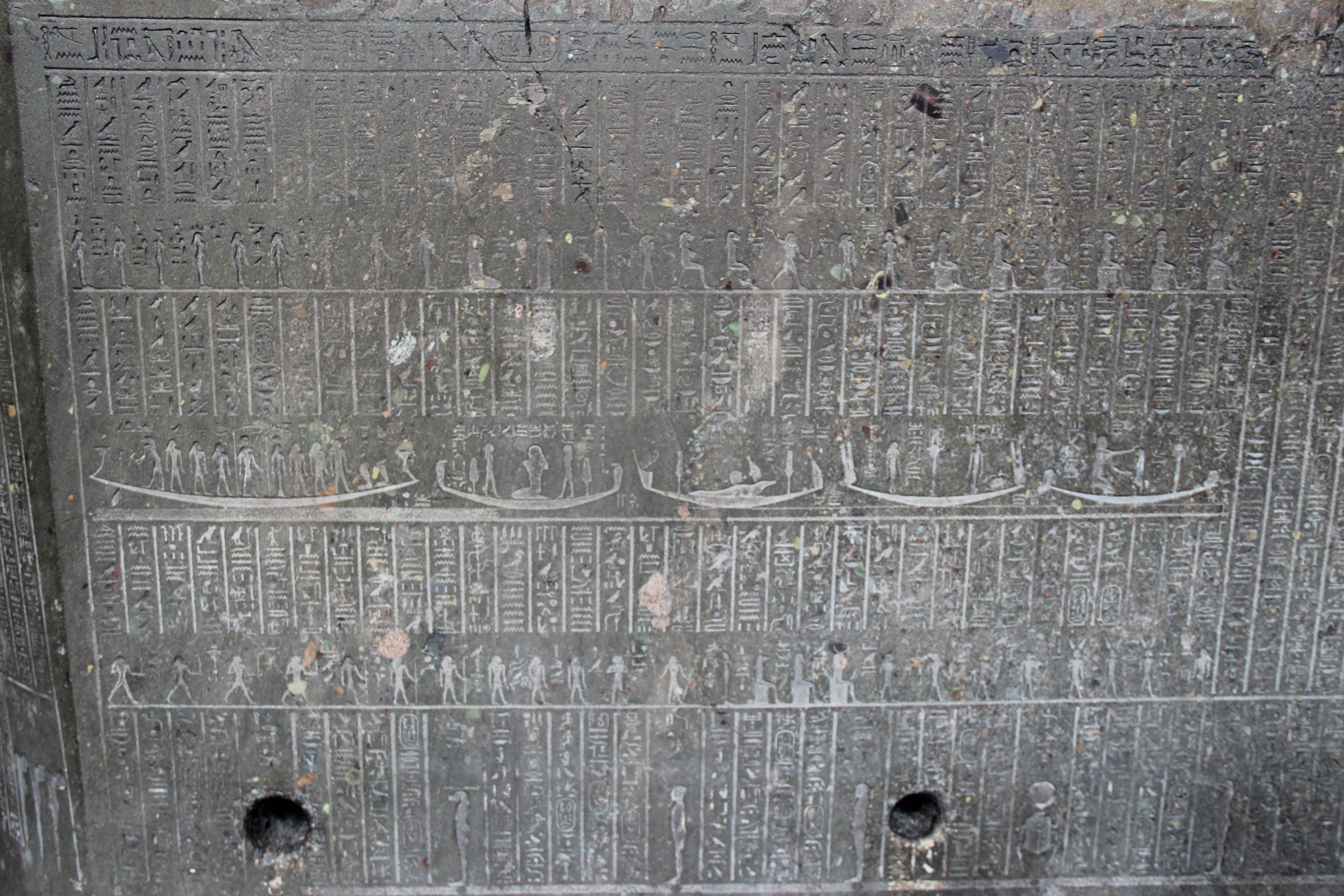
Sarcophagus of Nectanabo II. Seen at the bottom are the holes drilled for draining water.

It has been argued that the sarcophagus did indeed house the remains of Alexander the Great. Alexander the Great's body was temporarily entombed in Memphis following his death in 323 BC, and Saqqara is a suspected location of his temporary Memphite tomb. Nectanebo had erected a temple there, where he may have intended to be laid to rest. It is possible the tomb was vacant in Memphis at the same time Alexander's body was placed there. When Alexander's remains were moved to Alexandria in 280 BC, it may have been moved along with the sarcophagus. In an article in the Egyptology journal Kmt (fall 2020), Andrew Chugg showed that a 3rd century BC fragment of a high status Macedonian tomb found embedded in the foundations of St Mark's Basilica in Venice in 1960 (which was believed to have been brought over from Alexandria along with the relics of St. Mark in 828 AD) is an exact fit as part of a tomb-casing for the sarcophagus, sparking renewed claims that the sarcophagus once held Alexander's remains.

At the Attarine Mosque, where it was found by Napoleon's men, holes had been drilled in the sarcophagus. It had been used as a ritual bath when Alexandria was under Islamic rule.

=== Nectanebo and the Alexander Romance ===
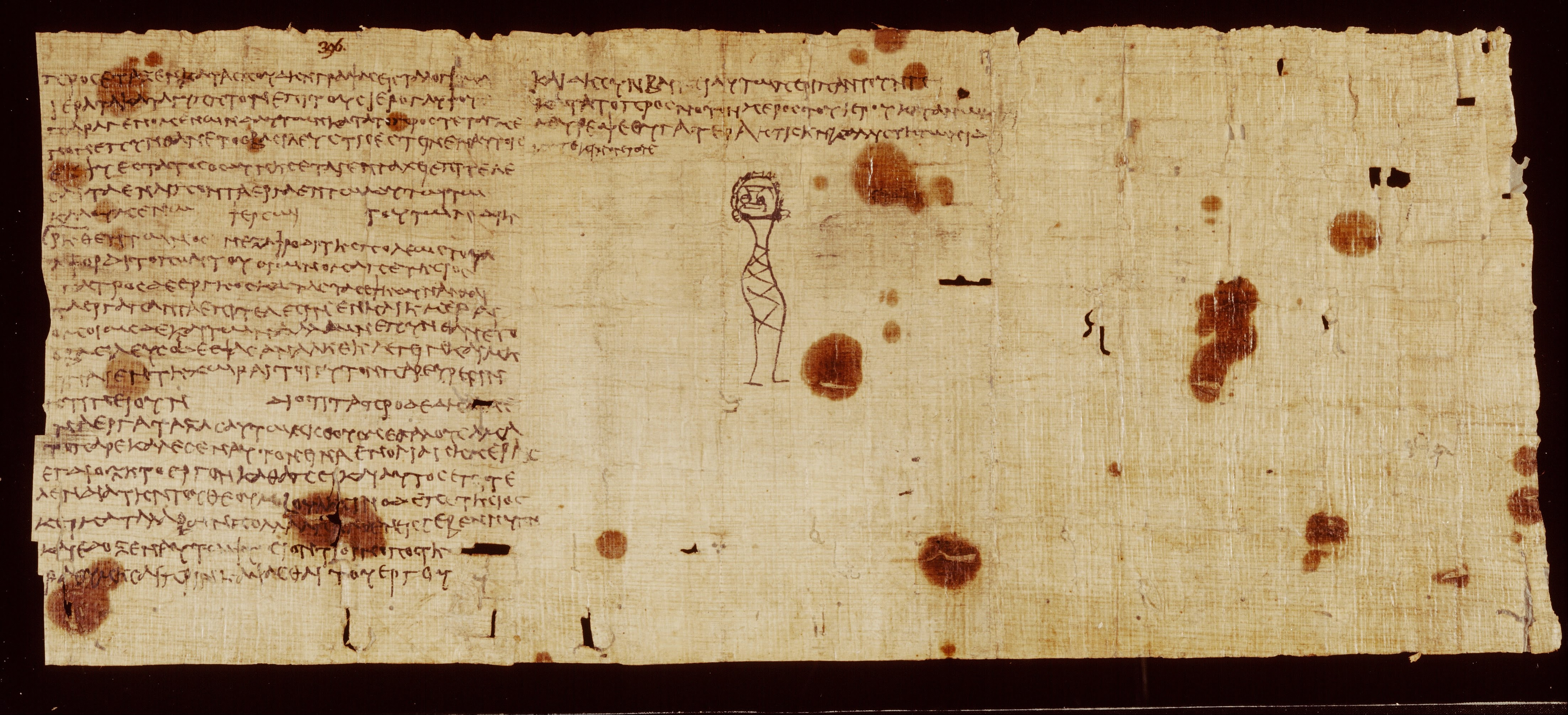
Papyrus of the Dream of Nectanebo, c. 160–150 BC

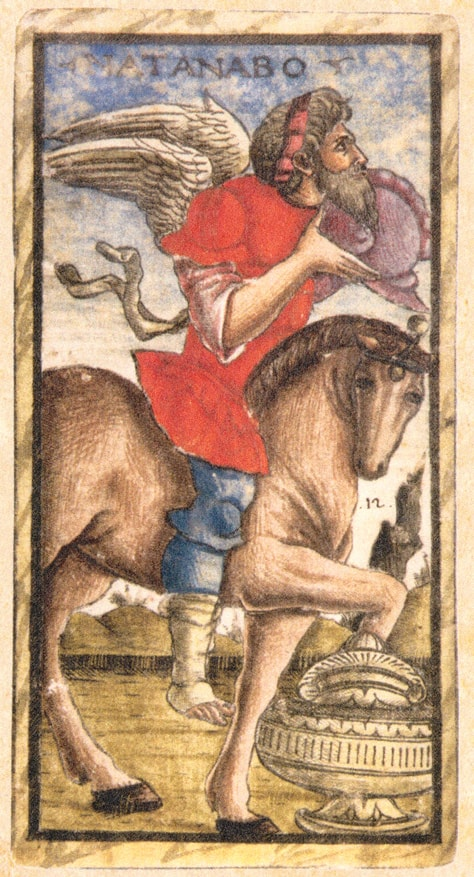
Natanabo, from Sola Busca Tarot (Northern Italy, c. 1491, Pinacoteca di Brera, Milan)

There is an apocryphal tale appearing in the pseudo-historical Alexander Romance that details another end for the last native pharaoh. Soon after Alexander the Great's godhood was confirmed by the Libyan Sibyl of Zeus Ammon at the Siwa Oasis, a rumor was begun that Nectanebo II, following defeat in his last battle, did not travel to Nubia but instead to the court of Philip II of Macedon in the guise of an Egyptian magician. There, while Philip was away on campaign, Nectanebo convinced Philip's wife Olympias that Amun was to come to her and that they would father a son. Nectanebo, disguising himself as Amun, slept with Olympias and from this event came Alexander.

This myth would hold strong appeal for the Egyptians, who desired continuity and harbored a strong dislike for foreign rule. In art of this event, Nectanebo is usually depicted as having dragon-like features, for example in the Speculum Historiale.

In the early Ptolemaic tale of Nectanebo and Petesis, preserved only in a Greek fragment from the Serapeum of Saqqara, the pharaoh has a prophetic dream of Isis in which the god Onuris is angry with him because of his unfinished temple in Sebennytos. Nectanebo calls in the best sculptor of the realm, Petesis, to finish the job, but he bungles his assignment when he gets drunk and chases a beautiful girl instead. The narrative ends abruptly here, but this is probably the preface to the fall of Egypt. Al-Biruni's A History of India reproduces the story.

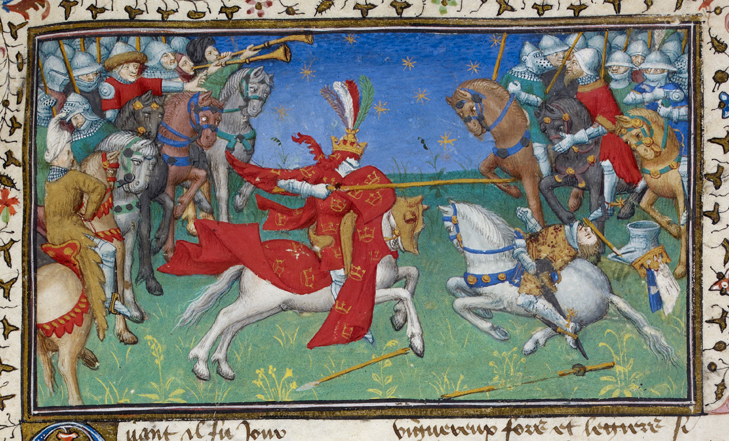
Alexander unhorsing Porrus, the King of India (BL Royal MS B xx, c. 1420)

The legend of Nectanebo (or Nectanebus, or Natanabo, as reported in some versions of the Alexander Romance) left a profound mark on European culture up to the Renaissance and beyond. It is no coincidence that this character is included in the Sola Busca tarot (with the name Natanabo) together with other important "actors" of the same legend: Alexander, Philip of Macedon, Olympias and Ammon. An alchemical interpretation of this character was provided by the Italian scholar Sofia Di Vincenzo in a study on the Sola Busca Tarot, where she explains that Natanabo represents a celestial messenger who came to earth with a gift, the helmet, which is a symbol of invulnerability and both physical and mental potency.

== Bibliography ==
- Depuydt, Leo (2010). "New Date for the Second Persian Conquest, End of Pharaonic and Manethonian Egypt: 340/39 B.C.E.". Journal of Egyptian History. 3 (2): 191–230. doi:10.1163/187416610X541709.
- Lloyd, Alan B. (1994). "Egypt, 404–332 B.C.". In D.M. Lewis; John Boardman; Simon Hornblower & M. Ostwald (eds.). The Cambridge Ancient History VI: The Fourth Century B.C. (2nd ed.). Cambridge University Press. pp. 337–360. ISBN 0-521-23348-8.
- Myśliwiec, Karol (2000). The twilight of ancient Egypt: first millennium B.C.E. Ithaca, N.Y: Cornell University Press. p. 173. ISBN 978-0-8014-3716-8.
- Nawotka, Krzysztof (2017). The Alexander Romance by Ps.-Callisthenes: A Historical Commentary. Leiden: Brill. ISBN 978-90-04-33521-9.
- Pascual, José (2013). "La datación de la ascensión al trono de Esparta de Agesilao II y la cronología de la dinastía XXX egipcia". Gerión. Vol. 30. Complutense University of Madrid. pp. 29–49. doi:10.5209/rev_GERI.2012.v30.41802. ISSN 0213-0181.
- Ragab, Mahmoud & Somaglino, Claire, A Remarkable Set of Blocks from the Reign of Nectanebo II Found at Awlad Musa, near Suez, BIFAO 2019, pp.317-362

Preceded by Teos	Pharaoh of Egypt; 358–340 BC	Succeeded by Artaxerxes III
