= Thirtieth Dynasty of Egypt =

380–343 BC ancient Egyptian dynasty

- 380 BC – 343 BC
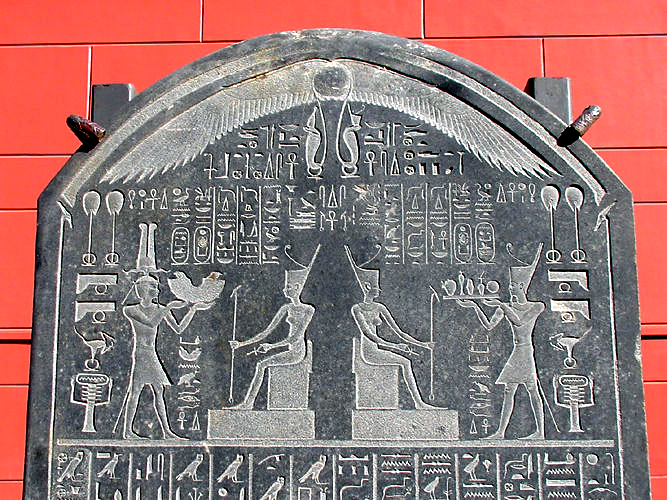
- Stele of Nectanebo I
- Capital: Sebennytos
- Common languages: Egyptian language
- Religion: Ancient Egyptian religion
- Government: Absolute monarchy
- Historical era: Classical antiquity
  - Deposition of Nefaarud II: 380 BC
  - Flight of Nectanebo II: 343 BC
- Currency: Egyptian gold stater
Preceded by	Succeeded by
Twenty-ninth Dynasty of Egypt	Thirty-first Dynasty of Egypt

The Thirtieth Dynasty of Egypt (notated Dynasty XXX, alternatively 30th Dynasty or Dynasty 30) is usually classified as the fifth Dynasty of the Late Period of ancient Egypt. It was founded after the overthrow of Nepherites II in 380 BC by Nectanebo I, and was disestablished upon the invasion of Egypt by the Achaemenid king Artaxerxes III in 343 BC. This is the final native dynasty of ancient Egypt.

== History ==
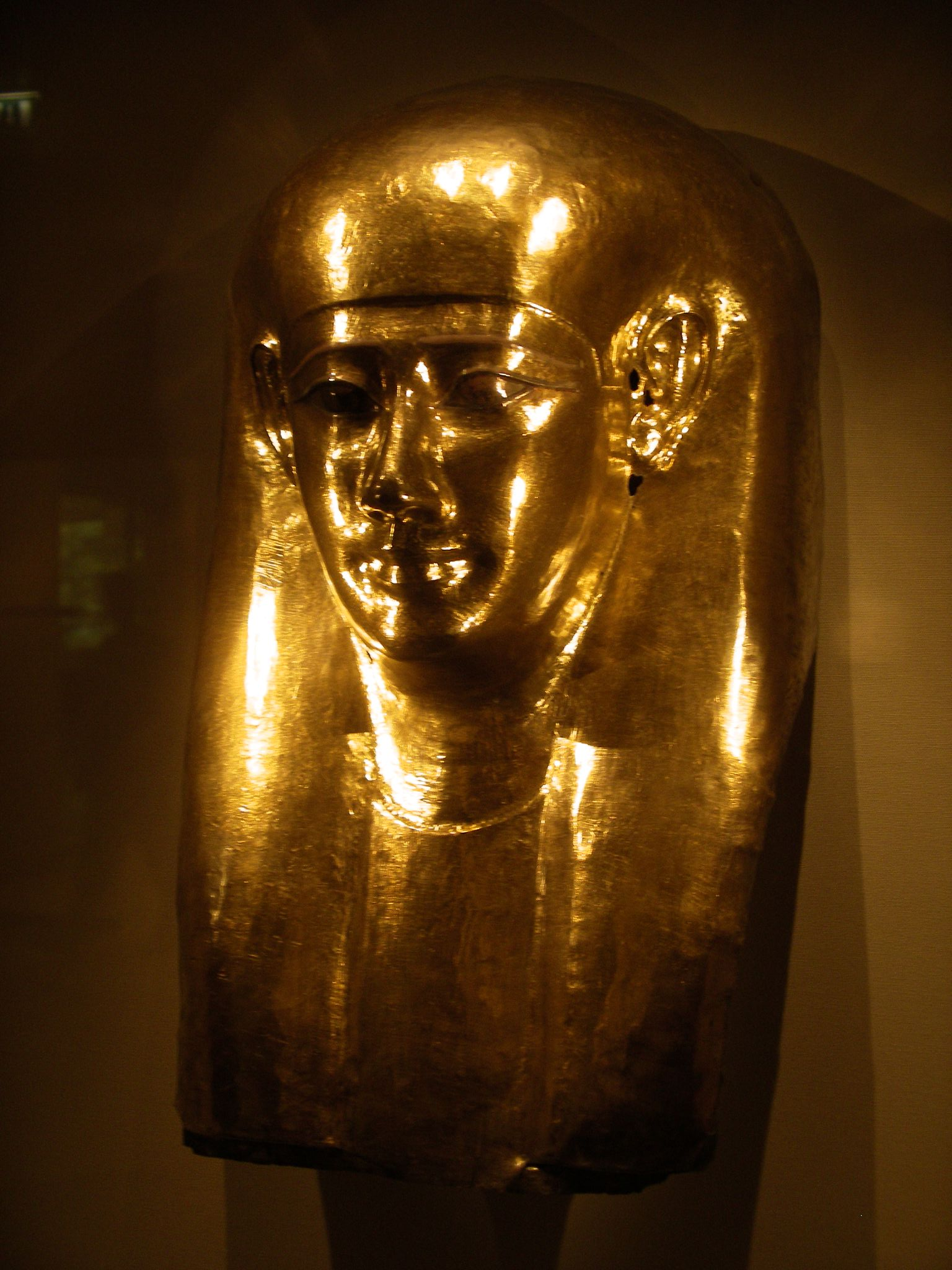
A 30th dynasty Egyptian funerary mask

Nectanebo I had gained control of all of Egypt by November of 380 BC, but spent much of his reign defending his kingdom from Persian reconquest with the occasional help of Sparta or Athens. In 365 BC, Nectanebo made his son, Teos, co-king and heir, and until his death in 363 BC, father and son reigned together. After his father's death, Teos invaded the Persian territories of modern Syria and Israel and was beginning to meet with some successes when he lost his throne due to the machinations of his own brother Tjahapimu. Tjahepimu took advantage of Teos' unpopularity within Egypt by declaring his son—and Teos' nephew, Nectanebo II—king. The Egyptian army rallied around Nectanebo II which forced Teos to flee to the court of the king of Persia.

Nectanebo II's reign was dominated by the efforts of the Persian rulers to reconquer Egypt, which they considered a satrapy in revolt. For the first ten years, Nectanebo avoided the Persian reconquest because Artaxerxes III was forced to consolidate his control of the realm. Artaxerxes then attempted an unsuccessful invasion of Egypt in the winter of 351/350 BC; the repercussions of his defeat prompted revolts in Cyprus, Phoenicia, and Cilicia. Although Nectanebo gave support to these revolts, Artaxerxes eventually suppressed them and was once again able to invade Egypt in 343 BC. This second invasion proved successful, and Nectanebo was forced to withdraw from his defenses in the Nile Delta to Memphis, where he saw that his cause was lost. He thereupon fled south to Nubia, where he is assumed to have found refuge at the court of King Nastasen of Napata. Nectanebo, however, may have managed to maintain some form of independent rule in the south of Egypt for 2 more years since a document from Edfu is dated to his eighteenth year.

Although a shadowy figure named Khababash proclaimed himself king and led a rebellion against the Persians from about 338 to 335 BC, Nectanebo has been considered the last native pharaoh of Egypt. His flight marked the end of Egypt as an independent entity.

== Pharaohs of the 30th Dynasty ==
Name of Pharaoh	Image	Reign	Prenomen (Throne name)	Horus-name	Comments
Nectanebo I (Nakhtnebef I)		380–362 BC	Kheperkare	Tjemaa	Son of a military official named Teos (not to be confused with his own son and successor) and himself a prominent general, he deposed and likely killed Nefaarud II to end the Twenty-ninth Dynasty. The elder Nectanebo moved the capital of Egypt from Mendes to Sebennytos. He also engaged in many building projects across Egypt, perhaps outdoing many of his predecessors; Nectanebo is credited with beginning the construction of the Temple of Isis at Philae, among other things. He respected religion and attempted to bring Egypt closer to the gods by restoring monuments and giving them gifts, as well as defended Egypt from the aggressive Achaemenid Empire.
Teos (Djedhor)		362–360 BC	Irmaatenre	Khaemmaatseshemtawy	Co-regent with his father Nectanebo I from about 365 BC, Teos became unpopular with the Egyptian people because he raised taxes to fund a military campaign to conquer Achaemenid Syria and Palestine, including the satrapies of Eber-Nari and Phoenicia. The king's brother, Tjahapimu, took advantage of this to install his own son, Nectanebo II, on the throne.
Nectanebo II (Nakhtnebef II)		360–343 BC	Senedjemibra Setenpeninhur	Merytawy	The last native ruler of ancient Egypt, his deposition marked the end of Egyptian hegemony until 1952. Nectanebo, however, was a very competent pharaoh, perhaps the most energetic of the dynasty, as he engaged in building and repairing monuments on a scale exceeding that of his grandfather's, forged alliances with the Greek poleis, and boosted the economy. He was overthrown by Artaxerxes III around 343 BC and fled to Nubia; his subsequent fate is lost to history, although some believe he died shortly after.

== Family tree ==
Djedhor A	[...]mu (♀)
Nectanebo I	Meryethapi (♀)	Nesibanebdjedet A
Teos	Tjahapimu	Udjashu (♀)	Tikhabes (♀)	Pediamun
Khedebneithirbinet II (?) (♀)	Nectanebo II	Nakhtnebef A
unnamed son

Preceded by Twenty-ninth Dynasty	Dynasties of Egypt c. 380 BC–343 BC	Succeeded by Thirty-first Dynasty
