= 330s BC =

This article concerns the period 339 BC – 330 BC.

== Events ==
=== By place ===
==== Greece ====
- Philip II of Macedon decides to attack the Scythians, using as an excuse their reluctance to allow Philip to dedicate a statue of Heracles at the Danube estuary. The two armies clash on the plains of modern-day Dobruja. The ninety-year-old King of the Scythians, Ateas, is killed during the battle and his army is routed.
- During a meeting of the Amphictyonic Council, Philip accuses the citizens of the town of Amfissa, in Locris, of intruding on consecrated ground. The Amphictyonic Congress, with the initial support of the Athenian representative, Aeschines, decides to inflict a harsh punishment upon the Locrians. After the failure of a first military excursion against the Locrians, the summer session of the Amphictyonic Council gives command of the league's forces to Philip and asks him to lead a second excursion. Philip acts at once, and his forces pass through Thermopylae, enter Amfissa and defeat the Locrians who are led by Chares, the Athenian general and mercenary commander.
- Xenocrates is elected as head of the Greek Academy replacing Speusippus.

==== Roman Republic ====
- The Roman consul Titus Manlius Imperiosus Torquatus defeats the Latins in the Battle of Trifanum.

== 338 BC ==
=== By place ===
==== Persian Empire ====
- The Persian general and vizier, the eunuch Bagoas, falls out of favour with King Artaxerxes III. Bagoas seeks to remain in office by replacing Artaxerxes with his youngest son Arses, whom he thinks will be easier to control. So Bagoas murders Artaxerxes III and all his sons, other than Arses, who is then placed on the throne by Bagoas. Artaxerxes IV Arses is little more than a puppet-king while Bagoas acts as the power behind the throne.

==== Macedonia ====
- After his significant victory over the Locrians, Philip II of Macedon swiftly enters Phocis. He then turns southeast down the Cephissus valley, seizes Elateia and restores the fortifications of the city.
- Athens arranges an alliance with Euboea, Megara, Achaea, Corinth, Acarnania and some other states in the Peloponnesus. However, the most desirable ally for Athens is Thebes. Therefore, the Athenian leader, Demosthenes, goes to the Boeotian city and secures an alliance with Thebes despite the efforts of a Macedonian deputation to persuade Thebes to join with Macedonia. In return, Athens agrees to Thebes controlling Boeotia, Thebes being in command solely on land and jointly at sea, and Athens paying two thirds of the campaign's cost.
- August 2 – Philip II of Macedon defeats the Athenians and Thebans in the Battle of Chaeronea in western Boeotia. His son, Alexander, commands the left wing of the Macedonian army during the battle. In victory, Philip II is harsh on Thebes, but merciful on Athens, thanks to the efforts of the Athenian orator and diplomat, Demades, who helps negotiate a peace agreement between Macedonia and Athens.
- Philip II advances into Peloponnesus. He defeats Thessaly, subdues Sparta and summons a Pan-Hellenic Congress at Corinth. This results in the establishment of Macedonian hegemony over central Greece (including Athens).
- Philip II invaded and devastated much of Laconia, turning the Spartans out, though he did not seize Sparta itself.
- Athenian statesman and orator, Lycurgus, is given control of the state's finances and goes about doubling the annual public revenues.
- King Archidamus III of Sparta, after five years of campaigning in southern Italy, fails to achieve any decisive results and while leading a mercenary army to help Tarentum against the Lucanians, is killed with most of his troops at Manduria in Calabria.
- King Archidamus III is succeeded as the Eurypontid King of Sparta by his son, Agis III.

==== Sicily ====
- Carthage makes another effort to conquer all of Sicily. The Carthaginians dispatch some mercenaries to extend the conflict between Timoleon and the Sicilian tyrants. But this effort ends in the defeat of Hicetas, the tyrant of Leontini, who is taken prisoner and put to death. By a treaty between Syracuse and Carthage, the dominion of Carthage in Sicily is confined to the lands west of the Halycus (Platani) River.
- With peace finally achieved with Carthage, Timoleon of Syracuse is able to depose two more tyrants in Sicily and then retires into private life.

==== Roman Republic ====
- The Latin War ends with the Latin League being dissolved and the individual Latin cities having to accept Rome's terms. Many of the cities are incorporated into the Roman state. In making peace with the cities of the defeated Latin League, Rome offers liberal terms. The men of many of these cities are granted citizenship and, as a result, Rome gains friends rather than enemies.
- With the fall of their chief city, Antium, to the Romans, the Volsci finally abandon their resistance against the Romans and accept an alliance with Rome.

== 337 BC ==
=== By place ===
==== Greece ====
- At a Pan-Hellenic Conference in Corinth, Philip II of Macedon announces the formation of the League of Corinth to liberate the Greek cities of Asia Minor from Persian rule, ostensibly because the Persian King, Arses, refuses to make reparations to Philip for Artaxerxes III's aid to the city of Perinthus when it was resisting Philip. All the Greek cities (except Sparta) and the Greek islands swear their support to the league and to recognise Philip as president of the League. Philip establishes a council of representatives from all the Greek states, which is empowered to deliberate and decide on the actions to be taken. However, the real power lies with Philip who is declared commander of the League's army.
- Olympias is put aside by her husband Philip II, following Philip's marriage to a girl named Cleopatra (who is renamed Eurydice). Their son, Alexander, is effectively disowned by Philip's actions. Philip II has Ptolemy, along with other companions of his son, exiled.

==== Roman Republic ====
- A plebeian is chosen to be praetor of Rome for the first time.

== 336 BC ==
=== By place ===
==== Achaemenid Empire ====
- The young king of Persia, Arses, objects to being controlled by Bagoas and attempts to poison him. Instead, Arses and all his children are killed by Bagoas.
- Bagoas then seeks to install a new monarch who will be easier to control. He chooses Codomannus, a distant relative of the royal house, who takes the name Darius III. When Darius tries to assert his independence from Bagoas' control, Bagoas attempts to poison him, but the king is warned and forces Bagoas to drink the poison himself.

==== Macedonia ====
- Following Philip II of Macedon's marriage to Eurydice, Alexander and his mother, Olympias, flee to Epirus, with Alexander later moving to Illyria. However, shortly afterward, father and son are reconciled and Alexander returns; but his position as heir is tenuous.
- Macedonian troops, commanded by Parmenion, trusted lieutenant of Philip II, arrive in Asia Minor, but are driven back by Persian forces under the command of the Greek mercenary Memnon of Rhodes.
- At a grand celebration of his daughter Cleopatra's marriage to Alexander I of Epirus (brother of Olympias), Philip II is assassinated at Aegae by Pausanias of Orestis, a young Macedonian bodyguard with a bitter grievance against the young queen's uncle Attalus and against Philip for denying him justice. Pausanias is killed on the spot.
- Following his assassination, Philip II of Macedon is succeeded by his son Alexander III. Suspecting the princes of the Lynkestis region of killing Phillip II, Alexander executes them all. The League of Corinth promotes Alexander to general of a unified Greek army for its planned invasion of Asia Minor.
- Alexander immediately has Amyntas IV, son of King Perdiccas III and his cousin, executed.
- Alexander puts down a rebellion in Macedonia and crushes the rebellious Illyrians. He then appears at the gates of Thebes and receives the city's submission. After that he advances to the Corinthian isthmus and is elected by the assembled Greeks as their commander against Persia.
- Conscription is introduced in Athens. Young men are required to perform duties which are part military and part civic.
- Aeschines brings a suit against Ctesiphon for illegally proposing the award of a crown to the Athenian leader Demosthenes in recognition of his services to Athens.

== 335 BC ==
=== By place ===
==== Greece ====
- Returning to Macedonia by way of Delphi (where the Pythian priestess acclaims him "invincible"), King Alexander III of Macedonia advances into Thrace in order to secure the Danube as the northern boundary of the Macedonian kingdom. After forcing the Shipka Pass and crushing the Triballi, he crosses the Danube to disperse the Getae. Turning west, he then defeats and shatters a coalition of Illyrians who are invading Macedonia.
- A rumour that Alexander has been killed by the Illyrians leads the Thebans and Athenians to take up arms again. Alexander defeats the Greeks and razes Thebes. In Thebes, 6,000 people are killed and all survivors are sold into slavery.
- After conquering Thebes, Alexander demands the surrender of the mercenary commanders, Chares and Charidemus, among others. Chares escapes to the Troad while Charidemus is banished and flees to Persia.
- The admiration of Alexander for the Athenian orator and diplomat, Demades, leads the conqueror to treat Athens leniently despite its involvement in the rebellion. A special Athenian embassy led by Phocion, an opponent of the anti-Macedonian faction, is able to persuade Alexander to give up his demand for the exile of the leaders of the anti-Macedonian party, particularly Demosthenes.
- Aristotle returns to Athens from Macedon and opens a peripatetic school in an old gymnasium called the Lyceum. It contains a museum of natural history, zoological gardens and a library.

==== Roman Republic ====
- Marcus Valerius Corvus is elected consul of the Roman Republic for the fourth time.
- Cales (modern Calvi), a city in Campania, is taken by the Romans and a Roman colony is established there.

=== By topic ===
==== Art ====
- The sculptor Praxiteles ends his active career in Athens (approximate date).

== 334 BC ==
=== By place ===
==== Persian Empire ====
- The king of Caria, Pixodarus, dies and is succeeded by his son-in-law, Orontobates.
- As the Persian satraps have gathered for a war council at Zeleia, Memnon argues that it is preferable for the Persians to avoid a pitched battle and adopt a scorched earth tactic. Arsites, the satrap of Hellespontine Phrygia, will not allow his land to be burned and agrees with other satraps to reject this cautious advice.

==== Macedonia ====
- King Alexander III of Macedonia crosses the Dardanelles, leaving Antipater, who has already faithfully served his father, Philip II, as his deputy in Greece with over 13,000 men. Alexander himself commands about 30,000 foot soldiers and over 5,000 cavalry, of whom nearly 14,000 are Macedonians and about 7,000 are allies sent by the Greek League.
- May – Alexander wins a major victory against the Persians commanded by the Greek mercenary Memnon of Rhodes, in the Battle of the Granicus near the Sea of Marmara. A large number of King Darius III's Greek mercenaries are massacred, but 2,000 survivors are sent back to Macedonia in chains.
- Alexander accepts the surrender of the Persian provincial capital of Sardis (and its treasury) and proceeds down the Ionian coast.
- At Halicarnassus, Alexander successfully undertakes the first of many sieges, eventually forcing his opponents, the mercenary captain Memnon of Rhodes and the Persian satrap of Caria, Orontobates, to withdraw by sea. Alexander leaves Caria in the hands of Ada, who was the ruler of Caria before being deposed by her brother-in-law, Pixodarus.
- Alexander's victory exposes western Asia Minor to the Macedonians, and most of the cities in the region hasten to open their gates. The Ionian city of Miletus defies Alexander and he has to subdue it through a siege.

==== Italy ====
- Alexander of Epirus, at the request of the colony of Taras (Tarentum) crosses over into Italy, to aid them against the Lucanians and Bruttii. He wins victories over the Italian Samnite tribes.

==== China ====
- The rulers of Wei and Qi agree to recognize each other as kings, formalizing the independence of the Warring States and the powerlessness of the Zhou dynasty.

== 333 BC ==
- King Alexander of Macedonia conquers western Asia Minor, subduing the hill tribes of Lycia and Pisidia.
- King Darius III of Persia executes Charidemus, a Greek mercenary leader living in exile in Persia, for criticising preparations taken for the Battle of Issus.
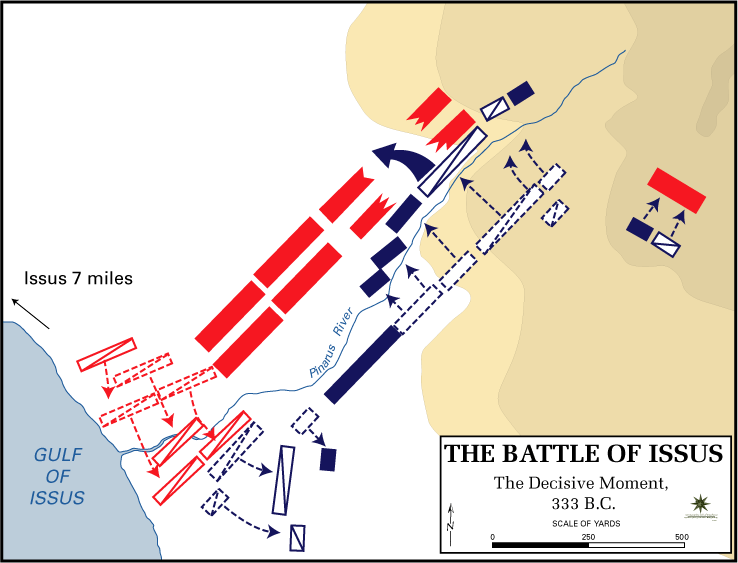
- The Battle of Issus
  Alexander has a great victory over the Persians in the Battle of the Issus River in Cilicia, but the Persian Emperor Darius III escapes. Darius leaves behind his wife, his two daughters, his mother Sisygambis.
- Alexander makes one of his officers, Nearchus, satrap of the newly conquered Lycia and Pamphylia in Anatolia and he appoints his general, Antigonus, satrap of Phrygia.
- From Issus, Alexander marches south into Syria and Phoenicia, his object being to isolate the Persian fleet from its bases and so to destroy it as an effective fighting force. The Phoenician cities of Marathus and Aradus do not resist Alexander's armies. Parmenion is sent ahead to try to secure Damascus and its rich booty, including Darius' war chest.
- After taking Byblos and Sidon, Alexander lays siege to Tyre.
- In reply to a letter from Darius offering peace, Alexander demands Darius' unconditional surrender.
- Nastasen king of kush repelled an invasion by a Egyptian leader named "Kambustan", likely the rebel leader khabash and won many valuable war spoils including river faires.

== 332 BC ==
=== By place ===
==== Persian Empire ====
- The Persian King Darius III twice sends on horseback to Alexander letters of friendship. The second time he offers a large ransom for his family, the ceding of all of the Persian Empire west of the Euphrates River, and the hand of his daughter in return for an alliance. Alexander rejects both letters and marches into Mesopotamia.
- At the acropolis in Susa, an unidentified woman is buried in a bronze sarcophagus, wearing "a mass of finely-wrought and artistic gems and jewels" and two coins, one dating from 350 BC and the other from 332 BC. The tomb will remain unopened for more than 22 centuries, until French archaeologist Jacques de Morgan unearths it on February 10, 1901.

==== Macedonia ====
- Alexander the Great occupies Damascus and, after a siege lasting seven months, destroys Tyre during which there is great carnage and the sale of the women and children into slavery.
- Leaving Parmenion in Syria, Alexander advances south without opposition until he reaches Gaza where bitter resistance halts him for two months, and he sustains a serious shoulder wound during a sortie.
- Alexander conquers Egypt from the Persians. The Egyptians welcome him as their deliverer, and the Persian satrap Mazaces wisely surrenders. Alexander's conquest of Egypt completes his control of the whole eastern Mediterranean coast.
- November 14 – Alexander is crowned as pharaoh of Upper and Lower Egypt – god and king all at once – son of Ra and Osiris, Horus the "Golden One" and beloved of Amun.
- Alexander spends the winter organizing the administration of Egypt. He employs Egyptian governors, while keeping the army under a separate Macedonian command.
- Alexander founds the city of Alexandria near the western arm of the Nile on a site between the sea and Lake Mareotis, protected by the island of Pharos, and has the city laid out by the Rhodian architect Deinocrates.

==== Italy ====
- After a victory over the Samnites and Lucanians near Paestum, Alexander of Epirus makes a treaty with the Romans.

== 331 BC ==
=== By place ===
==== Macedonia ====
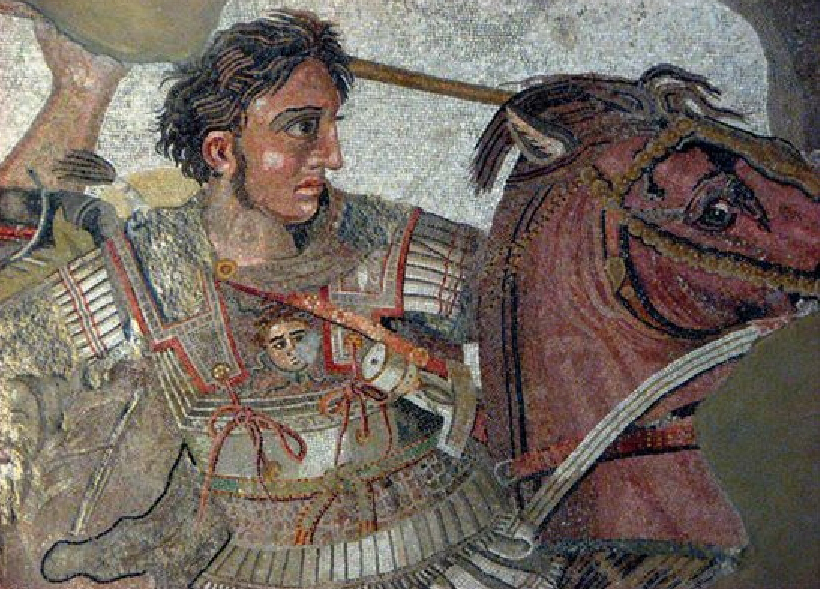
Alexander the Great is portrayed at the Battle of Gaugamela (331 BCE) on a mosaic found on the floor of the House of the Faun in Pompeii. He is astride his famous horse Bucephalos and wears a breastplate decorated with the head of Medusa.

- Late January – Alexander the Great travels with a small bodyguard (among them is the future Egyptian ruler Ptolemy I Soter) along the coastal road of Egypt and reaches the settlement of Paraetonium on the borders of Cyrenaica. There, he receives a delegation of emissaries from Cyrene, who grants him a number of gifts including fine horses and chariots. Alexander concludes a treaty of peace and alliance with them. He turns inland from the Mediterranean and travels through the Libyan Desert to the Siwah Oasis, which he reaches in late February. Alexander consults the famous oracle and is pronounced the son of Zeus-Ammon as his true father.
- Alexander departs from Egypt and leads his forces towards Phoenicia. He leaves Cleomenes of Naucratis as the ruling nomarch to control Egypt.
- October 1 – Alexander is victorious in the Battle of Gaugamela (near ancient Ninevah) over the Persian King Darius III. Alexander pursues the defeated Persian forces to Arbela, Darius moves his Bactrian cavalry and Greek mercenaries into Media.
- For the first time, Alexander encounters war elephants after the battle in Darius' camp. In the capital, Susa, Alexander gains access to huge treasures amounting to 50,000 gold talents (equivalent of today circa 77 billion USD).

==== Greece ====
- From Thapsacus on the Euphrastes River, Alexander led the Greek army toward the Tigris River, leading to a victory over the Persians on October 31 at Gaugamela, after which Darius fled and escaped.
- While Alexander is fighting in Asia, Agis III of Sparta, profiting from the Macedonian king's absence from Greece, leads some of the Greek cities in a revolt. With Persian money and 8,000 Greek mercenaries, he holds Crete against Macedonian forces. In the Peloponnesus he routs a force under the Macedonian general Coragus and, although Athens stays neutral, he is joined by Elis, Achaea (except Pellene) and Arcadia, with the exception of Megalopolis, the staunchly anti-Spartan capital of Arcadia, which Agis III's forces besiege.
- Alexander's regent Antipater leads the Macedonians to victory over King Agis III in the Battle of Megalopolis.

==== Italy ====
- Alexander of Epirus takes Heraclea from the Lucanians, and Terina and Sipontum from the Bruttii.
- Tarentum turns against Alexander of Epirus when they realize that he intends to create a kingdom of his own in southern Italy. Alexander is defeated and killed in the Battle of Pandosia on the banks of the Acheron.

==== Roman Republic ====
- The Gallic tribe of the Senones and the Romans conclude a peace and enter upon a period of friendly relations which lasts the rest of the century.

== 330 BC ==
=== By place ===
==== Macedonian Empire ====
- January 20 – Alexander the Great defeats the Persians, led by satrap Ariobarzanes, at the Persian Gates. In this battle, Ariobarzan, supported by only 700 Persian Immortals, holds the vast Macedonian army of 17,000 men at bay for 30 days. At the end, his troops are surrounded by Alexander's army, because of a Persian shepherd, who leads it around the Persian defenses. However, instead of surrendering, Ariobarzan and his 700 Immortals fight to the last man. Some historians consider him to be the Leonidas of Persia.
- January 30 – After gaining the Pass of the Persian Gates, Alexander enters Persepolis. There he ceremonially burns down the palace of Xerxes I, as a symbol that the Panhellenic war of revenge is at an end.
- Before continuing his pursuit of Darius III, who has retreated into Bactria, Alexander assembles all the Persian treasure and entrusts it to Harpalus, who is to hold it at Ecbatana as chief treasurer. Parmenion is also left behind in Media to manage communications between Alexander and the rest of his rapidly growing lands.
- Alexander appoints Atropates as the satrap of Media while Mithrenes is appointed by Alexander as satrap of Armenia.
- Crossing the Elburz Mountains to the Caspian Sea, Alexander seizes Zadracarta in Hyrcania and receives the submission of a group of satraps and Persian notables, some of whom he confirms in their offices. He then travels westward and defeats the Mardi, a mountain people who inhabit the Elburz Mountains. He also accepts the surrender of Darius' Greek mercenaries.
- In Aria, Alexander's army defeats the satrap Satibarzanes, who initially offers to submit, only to later revolt. Alexander then founds the town of Alexandria of the Arians (modern Herat).
- At Phrada, in Drangiana, Philotas, Parmenion's son and commander of the elite Macedonian companion cavalry, is implicated in an alleged plot against Alexander's life. He is condemned by the army, and executed. A secret message is sent by Alexander to Cleander, Parmenion's second in command, who obediently kills Parmenion at Ecbatana in Media for fear that he will rise up in revolt at the news of his son's death. All of Parmenion's adherents are now eliminated and men close to Alexander are promoted.

==== Persian Empire ====
- July 17 – King Darius III is deposed and killed by Bessus, the satrap of Bactria. Bessus assumes the kingship as Artaxerxes V.

==== Macedonia ====
- Alexander's regent in Macedonia, Antipater, makes peace with the Thracians (with whom he has been warring) and then marches south with a large force of over 40,000 men. He wins a hard-fought Battle of Megalopolis in Arcadia against Agis III of Sparta and his Greek mercenaries. Agis III is killed, and Spartan resistance is broken.
- Aeschines continues to try to prevent Demosthenes from being awarded a golden crown for his services to Athens. The case, which has begun in 336 BC, finally concludes with the overwhelming defeat of Aeschines, largely because of Demosthenes' brilliant speech for Ctesiphon (On the Crown).
- Following his defeat in the courts by Demosthenes, Aeschines leaves Athens for Rhodes, to teach rhetoric.

==== Roman Republic ====
- The Italian cities of Fondi and Privernum, led by Vitruvius Vaccus, launch a failed revolt against Rome.

=== By topic ===
==== Art ====
- Lysippos makes a bronze statue called The scraper (Apoxyomenos) (approximate date). A Roman copy after the original statue is today kept at Musei Vaticani in Rome.

== Births ==
339 BC

- Alexinus, Greek philosopher of Elis (approximate date)

338 BC

- Xuan, Chinese queen dowager of Chu (d. 265 BC)

337 BC

- Demetrius I Poliorcetes ("Besieger"), Antigonid dynasty king of Macedon (d. 283 BC)

335 BC

- Herophilos, Greek physician and first anatomist (d. 280 BC)

334 BC

- Zeno of Citium, Greek philosopher and the father of Stoicism (approximate date) (d. c. 262 BC)

== Deaths ==
339 BC

- Speusippus, head of Plato's Academy (b. 407 BC)
- Ateas, king of the Scythians (b. c. 429 BC)

338 BC

- Artaxerxes III, king of Persia (murdered) (b. c. 425 BC)
- Archidamus III, king of Sparta (killed in battle)
- Isocrates, Athenian orator and rhetorician (b. 436 BC)
- Shang Yang, Chinese statesman of Qin (b. 390 BC)
- Xiao of Qin, Chinese duke of Qin (b. 381 BC)

337 BC

- Approximate date – Timoleon, Greek statesman and general (b. c. 411 BC)
- Shen Pu-hai, Chinese bureaucrat, chief minister of Han

336 BC

- Amyntas IV, usurper king of Macedon
- Arses, King of Persia
- Attalus, Macedonian general (b. c. 390 BC)
- Bagoas, Vizier of Persia
- Eurydice, 7th wife of Philip II, queen of Macedonia
- Pausanias of Orestis, personal bodyguard of Philip II of Macedon
- Philip II, King of Macedonia (b. 382 BC)

335 BC

- Hicetas of Syracuse, Greek mathematician and philosopher (b. c. 400 BC)
- Eubulus, Athenian statesman (b. c. 405 BC)

334 BC

- Pixodarus, King of Caria

333 BC

- Charidemus, Greek mercenary leader
- Memnon of Rhodes, Greek mercenary leader (b. 380 BC)

331 BC

- Alexander I of Epirus, Aeacid dynasty king of Epirus (b. c. 370 BC)
- Vahe, legendary king of Armenia and last of the Hyke dynasty

330 BC

- Agis III, Eurypontid king of Sparta (killed in battle)
- Darius III, king of Persia, was killed in Bactria (b. c. 380 BC)
- Kidinnu, Chaldean astronomer and mathematician
- Parmenion (also Parmenio), Macedonian general (murdered) (b. c. 400 BC)
- Philotas, Macedonian officer and son of Parmenio (executed)
- Theopompus of Chios, Greek historian and rhetorician (b. c. 380 BC)
