= 410s BC =

Decade

This decade witnessed the continuing decline of the Achaemenid Empire, fierce warfare amongst the Greek city-states during the Peloponnesian War, the ongoing Warring States period in Zhou dynasty China, and the closing years of the Olmec civilization (lasting from c. 1200–400 BC) in modern-day Mexico.

== Events ==
=== 419 BC ===
==== By place ====
====== Greece ======
- Despite the Peace of Nicias still being in effect, Sparta's King Agis II gathers a strong army at Philus and descends upon Argos by marching at night from the north. His allied Boeotian forces fail him, but he is able to conclude a treaty with Argos. In 419 BC, the Argives, at the instigation of Alcibiades, attacked Epidaurus; and Agis with a large force from Lacedaemon set out and marched to the frontier city of Leuctra. No one, Thucydides tells us, knew the purpose of this expedition. It was probably to make a diversion in favour of Epidaurus.

==== By topic ====
====== Drama ======
- Euripides' play Andromache is performed.
- Sophocles' play Electra is performed. The play takes its theme from The Libation Bearers by Aeschylus.

=== 418 BC ===
==== By place ====
====== Greece ======
- King Agis II of Sparta escapes being fined 10,000 drachmae and having his house razed for his failure to press his advantage by promising more successful outcomes in the future.
- The Battle of Mantinea is the largest land battle of the Peloponnesian War (with as many as 10,000 troops on each side). Sparta under King Agis II has a major victory over Argos (and its allies Athens, Ellis and Mantinea), which has broken its treaty with Sparta's King Agis II at the insistence of Alcibiades. Agis II's major victory makes amends with the Spartans for his earlier truce with Argos. The commander of the Athenian forces, Laches, is killed in the battle.
- Impressed with the Spartan victory, the inhabitants of Argos change their government from democracy to oligarchy and end their support for Athens in favour of an alliance with Sparta. Many of Argos' allies do the same. Athens becomes increasingly isolated.
- Alcibiades urges the Athenians to conquer Syracuse, subdue Sicily and Carthage and thus gain added forces that will enable them to finish the war against Sparta. His bold offensive plan wins the support of the Athenians.

=== 417 BC ===
==== By place ====
====== Greece ======
- Following the loss by Athens and its allies in the Battle of Mantinea, a political "tug of war" takes place in Athens. Alcibiades joins forces with Nicias against Hyperbolus, the successor of the demagogue politician Cleon as champion of the common people. Hyperbolus tries to bring about the ostracism of either Nicias or Alcibiades, but the two men combine their influence and induce the Athenian people to expel Hyperbolus instead.
- The second battle of Hysiae is fought between the armies of Sparta and Argos during the Peloponnesian War. The Spartan King Agis II was seeking to restore the pro-Spartan faction evicted from Argos by Alcibiades. While he failed to take the city of Argos, he did capture and subsequently destroy the town of Hysiae, killing all its male inhabitants.

=== 416 BC ===
==== By place ====
====== Greece ======
- With the encouragement of Alcibiades, the Athenians take the island of Melos (which has remained neutral during the Peloponnesian War). Its inhabitants are treated with great cruelty by the Athenians, with all the men capable of bearing arms being killed, while the women and children are made slaves.
- In Sicily, the Ionian city of Segesta asks for Athenian help from the Dorian city of Selinus (which is supported by the powerful Sicilian city of Syracuse). The people of Syracuse are ethnically Dorian (as are the Spartans), while the Athenians, and their allies in Sicily, are Ionian. The Athenians feel obliged to assist their ally and therefore prepare an armada to attack Sicily.

==== By topic ====
====== Drama ======
- The tragedian Agathon wins first prize at the Lenaia.

=== 415 BC ===
==== By place ====
====== Greece ======
- Athenian orator and politician, Andocides is imprisoned on suspicion of having taken part in the mutilation of the sacred busts called "Hermae" shortly before the departure of Athens' military expedition to Sicily. These mutilations cause a general panic, and Andocides is induced to turn informer. Andocides' testimony is accepted, and those whom he implicates, including Alcibiades, are condemned to death. Andocides is sent into exile.
- The Athenian expedition to Sicily sets sail under Nicias, Lamachus and Alcibiades. After his departure with the armada, Alcibiades is accused of profanity and is recalled to Athens to stand trial.
- After learning that he has been condemned to death in absentia, Alcibiades defects to Sparta and Nicias is placed in charge of the Sicilian expedition. The Athenian forces land at Dascon near Syracuse but with little result. Hermocrates heads the Syracusan defence.
- Alcibiades openly joins with the Spartans and persuades them to send Gylippus to assist Syracuse and to fortify Decelea in Attica. He also encourages Ionia to revolt against Athens. As a result, a Spartan fleet soon arrives to reinforce their allies in Syracuse and a stalemate ensues.
- Construction of the Temple of Hephaestus in Athens is completed. Construction had begun in 449 BC.

==== By topic ====
====== Drama ======
- Euripides' play The Trojan Women is performed shortly after the massacre by Athenians of the male population of Melos.

=== 414 BC ===
==== By place ====
====== Greece ======
- Athens responds to appeals from its general, Nicias, by sending out 73 vessels to Sicily under the command of Demosthenes to assist Nicias and his forces with the siege of Syracuse.
- The Athenian army moves to capture Syracuse while the larger fleet of Athenian ships blocks the approach to the city from the sea. After some initial success, the Athenian troops become disorganised in the chaotic night operation and are thoroughly routed by Gylippus, the Spartan commander. The Athenian commander Lamachus is killed. Nicias, although ill, is left in sole charge of the siege of Syracuse.

==== By topic ====
====== Drama ======
- Aristophanes' play The Birds is performed.

=== 413 BC ===
==== By place ====
====== Greece ======
- After suffering a defeat in which the Athenian commander Lamachus is killed, Demosthenes suggests that they immediately give up the siege of Syracuse and return to Athens, where they are needed to defend against a Spartan invasion of Attica. Nicias refuses, but the Syracusans and Spartans under Hermocrates are able to trap the Athenians in the harbour and the Athenians sustain heavy losses in the Battle of Syracuse. Demosthenes is ambushed by the Syracusans and is forced to surrender. Nicias is soon captured as well, and both are executed, with most of the surviving Athenian soldiers sent to work in the Sicilian quarries. Ten proboulos (including Sophocles) are elected to help run Athens.
- Tissaphernes, the Persian satrap of Lydia and Caria, forms an alliance with Sparta. The Spartans, with strategic advice from Alcibiades and limited assistance from the Persians under Pharnabazus, advance almost to the gates of Athens. King Agis II leads the Spartan force that occupies Decelea in Attica.
- Archelaus I becomes King of Macedonia following the death of his father, King Perdiccas II. Archelaus seizes the throne after murdering his uncle, his cousin, and his half brother, the legitimate heir.

==== By topic ====
====== Drama ======
- Euripides' play Electra is performed.

=== 412 BC ===
==== By place ====
====== Persian Empire ======
- The Persians under Darius II see their opportunity to play off one Greek city-state against another and to recover control of the Greek cities of Asia Minor, which have been under Athenian control since 449 BC. The satraps of Asia Minor, Tissaphernes and Pharnabazus, are ordered to collect overdue tribute.
- The Spartans sign a treaty of mutual help with the Persian satrap of Lower Asia, Tissaphernes. By the treaty of Miletus, Persia is given complete freedom in western Asia Minor in return for agreeing to pay for seamen to man the Peloponnesian fleet.

====== Greece ======
- Alcibiades helps stir up revolts amongst Athens' allies in Ionia, on the west coast of Asia Minor. However, Alcibiades loses the confidence of the Spartans and antagonises their king Agis II. As a result, he flees to the court of the Persian satrap Tissaphernes. Alcibiades advises Tissaphernes to withdraw his support from Sparta while conspiring with the oligarchic party in Athens, as Sparta's allied cities break away in a series of revolts.
- The Athenians vote to use their last reserves to build a new fleet.
- Clazomenae revolts against Athens. After a brief resistance, however, it again acknowledges the Athenian supremacy.
- An epidemic of an unknown disease hits Northern Greece.

====== Rome ======
- The epidemic hits the Roman Republic and causes a food shortage.

=== 411 BC ===
==== By place ====
====== Greece ======
- June 9 – The democracy of Athens is overthrown by the oligarchic extremists, Antiphon, Theramenes, Peisander and Phrynichus in an effort by the oligarchists to exert more control over the conduct of the war with Sparta and its allies. A "Council of Four Hundred" is set up. The total defeat of the Athenian expedition to Sicily and the consequent revolts of many of the subject-allies has weakened Athenian finances severely; the acknowledged purpose of the revolutionary movement is to revise the constitution to better run Athens' finances. However, its rule is high-handed and the Council of Four Hundred is only able to maintain itself for four months.
- When a mutiny breaks out amongst the troops who are fortifying Piraeus (the harbour for Athens), the Council sends Theramenes to quell it. Instead, he puts himself at the head of the mutineers. After Phrynichus, the leader of the extremists, is assassinated, an ensuing meeting of the Athenian Assembly deposes the Council and restores the traditional constitution, but restricts some of the privileges of citizenship to a body called the Five Thousand. The Assembly resumes its old form in being a committee of all citizens.
- The Athenian navy under Thrasybulus recalls Alcibiades from Sardis. Alcibiades' election is confirmed by the Athenians at the request of Theramenes. A Spartan fleet in the Hellespont at Cynossema is then defeated by an Athenian fleet commanded by Thrasybulus and Alcibiades.
- Antiphon defends himself in a speech Thucydides describes as the greatest ever made by a man on trial for his life. Nevertheless, Antiphon is unable to persuade his accusers and he is executed for treason.

==== By topic ====
====== Literature ======
- Euripides' play Iphigenia in Tauris is performed.
- Aristophanes' plays Lysistrata and Women Celebrating the Thesmophoria are performed.

=== 410 BC ===
==== By place ====
====== Greece ======
- Commanding 20 ships, the Athenian generals Theramenes and Thrasybulus collaborate with Alcibiades and the main Athenian fleet in inflicting a major defeat on the Spartan navy commanded by Mindarus and its supporting Persian land army near Cyzicus on the shore of the Propontis (Sea of Marmara). As a result of its victory in the Battle of Cyzicus, Athens regains control over the vital grain route from the Black Sea.
- Alcibiades installs a garrison at Chrysopolis under Theramenes to exact a tithe from all shipping that comes from the Black Sea. This revenue enables the Athenians to put an end to the regime of the Five Thousand and restore their traditional institutions in full. Democracy is restored in Athens. The new demagogue Cleophon dismisses peace overtures made by Sparta.
- An Oligarchic revolt in Corcyra is unsuccessful.

====== Cyprus ======
- Evagoras re-establishes his family's claim as kings of Salamis which has been under Phoenician control for a number of years.

==== By subject ====
====== Art ======
- A relief decoration from the parapet (now destroyed), Nike (Victory) adjusting her sandal is constructed in the Temple of Athena Nike on the Acropolis in Athens and is ready in 407 BC. It is now preserved at the Acropolis Museum in Athens.
- The grave stele of Hegeso is made and is finished about ten years later (approximate date). It is now preserved at the National Archaeological Museum in Athens.

== Significant people ==
- Euphemus of Athens, Archon of Athens. In office 417-416 BC
- Euripides of Athens, playwright
- Socrates of Athens, philosopher
- Sophocles of Athens, playwright
- Thucydides of Athens, historian and author of the History of the Peloponnesian War
- Hannibal Mago, King of Carthage, r. 440–406 BC
- Weilieh, Zhou dynasty king of China, r. 425–402 BC
- Tharrhypas, King of Epirus, r. 430–390 BC
- Perdiccas II, King of Macedon, r. 454–413 BC
- Archelaus I, King of Macedon, r. 413–399 BC
- Mahapadma Nanda, King (and founder) of the Nanda Dynasty in Magadha (in Ancient India), r. c. 420–362 BC
- Kosho, legendary Emperor of Japan, r. 475–393 BC
- Amanineteyerike, King of Kush r. 431–405 BC
- Darius II, King of the Achaemenid Persian Empire r. 423–404 BC
- Amyrtaeus of Egypt, Anti-Achaemenid rebel and future Pharaoh of Egypt
- Joiada of Judah, High-Priest of Israel, held position 433–410 BC
- Johanan of Judah, High-priest of Israel, held position 410–371 BC
- Malachi of Judah, prophet (according to Bible)
- Tissaphernes of Persia, Satrap of Lydia and Caria
- Abdemon, King of Salamis, r. 420–410 BC
- Evagoras, King of Salamis, r. 410–374 BC
- Pleistoanax (Agaid king r. 458–401 BC) and Agis II (Eurypontid king r. 427–400 BC), co-kings of Sparta.
- Seuthes I, King of Thrace, r. 424–410 BC
- Amadocus I, King of Thrace, r. 410–390 BC

== Contemporaries of future importance ==
- Artaxerxes of Persia, Achaemenid prince and future King of Persia
- Cyrus the Younger of Persia, Achaemenid prince and satrap
- Plato of Athens, student of Socrates and future philosopher
- Xenophon of Athens, soldier and future writer of Anabasis

== Births ==
418 BC

- Epaminondas of Thebes, Theban general and statesman (d. 362 BC)
- Iphicrates, Athenian general (approximate date) (d. c. 353 BC)

412 BC

- Diogenes of Sinope

411 BC

- Timoleon, Greek statesman and general (approximate date) (d. 337 BC)

== Deaths ==
418 BC

- Laches, Athenian aristocrat and general (b. c. 475 BC)

414 BC

- Lamachus, Athenian general

413 BC

- Demosthenes, Athenian general
- Nicias, Athenian soldier and statesman (b. 470 BC)
- Perdiccas II, Macedonian king

411 BC

- Antiphon, Athenian politician and orator (b. 480 BC)
- Phrynichus, Athenian general (assassinated)

410 BC

- Hippocrates of Chios, Greek mathematician and astronomer (approximate date)
