= 335 BC =

335 BC in various calendars
Gregorian calendar	335 BC; CCCXXXV BC
Ab urbe condita	419
Ancient Egypt era	XXXI dynasty, 9
Pharaoh	Darius III of Persia, 2
Ancient Greek Olympiad (summer)	111th Olympiad, year 2
Assyrian calendar	4416
Balinese saka calendar	N/A
Bengali calendar	−928 – −927
Berber calendar	616
Buddhist calendar	210
Burmese calendar	−972
Byzantine calendar	5174–5175
Chinese calendar	乙酉年 (Wood Rooster); 2363 or 2156 — to — 丙戌年 (Fire Dog); 2364 or 2157
Coptic calendar	−618 – −617
Discordian calendar	832
Ethiopian calendar	−342 – −341
Hebrew calendar	3426–3427
- Hindu calendars
Vikram Samvat	−278 – −277
Shaka Samvat	N/A
Kali Yuga	2766–2767
Holocene calendar	9666
Iranian calendar	956 BP – 955 BP
Islamic calendar	985 BH – 984 BH
Javanese calendar	N/A
Julian calendar	N/A
Korean calendar	1999
Minguo calendar	2246 before ROC 民前2246年
Nanakshahi calendar	−1802
Thai solar calendar	208–209
Tibetan calendar	阴木鸡年 (female Wood-Rooster) −208 or −589 or −1361 — to — 阳火狗年 (male Fire-Dog) −207 or −588 or −1360

Year 335 BC was a year of the pre-Julian Roman calendar. At the time, it was known as the Year of the Consulship of Calenus and Corvus (or, less frequently, year 419 Ab urbe condita). The denomination 335 BC for this year has been used since the early medieval period, when the Anno Domini calendar era became the prevalent method in Europe for naming years.

== Events ==
=== By place ===
==== Greece ====
- Returning to Macedonia by way of Delphi (where the Pythian priestess acclaims him "invincible"), King Alexander III of Macedonia advances into Thrace in order to secure the Danube as the northern boundary of the Macedonian kingdom. After forcing the Shipka Pass and crushing the Triballi, he crosses the Danube to disperse the Getae. Turning west, he then defeats and shatters a coalition of Illyrians who are invading Macedonia.
- A rumour that Alexander has been killed by the Illyrians leads the Thebans and Athenians to take up arms again. Alexander defeats the Greeks and razes Thebes. In Thebes, 6,000 people are killed and all survivors are sold into slavery.
- After conquering Thebes, Alexander demands the surrender of the mercenary commanders, Chares and Charidemus, among others. Chares escapes to the Troad while Charidemus is banished and flees to Persia.
- The admiration of Alexander for the Athenian orator and diplomat, Demades, leads the conqueror to treat Athens leniently despite its involvement in the rebellion. A special Athenian embassy led by Phocion, an opponent of the anti-Macedonian faction, is able to persuade Alexander to give up his demand for the exile of the leaders of the anti-Macedonian party, particularly Demosthenes.
- Aristotle returns to Athens from Macedon and opens a peripatetic school in an old gymnasium called the Lyceum. It contains a museum of natural history, zoological gardens and a library.

==== Roman Republic ====
- Marcus Valerius Corvus is elected consul of the Roman Republic for the fourth time.
- Cales (modern Calvi), a city in Campania, is taken by the Romans and a Roman colony is established there.

=== By topic ===
==== Art ====
- The sculptor Praxiteles ends his active career in Athens (approximate date).

== Births ==
- Herophilos, Greek physician and first anatomist (d. 280 BC)

== Deaths ==
- Hicetas of Syracuse, Greek mathematician and philosopher (b. c. 400 BC)
- Eubulus, Athenian statesman (b. c. 405 BC)
