= 330 BC =

330 BC in various calendars
Gregorian calendar	330 BC; CCCXXX BC
Ab urbe condita	424
Ancient Egypt era	XXXII dynasty, 3
Pharaoh	Alexander the Great, 3
Ancient Greek Olympiad (summer)	112th Olympiad, year 3
Assyrian calendar	4421
Balinese saka calendar	N/A
Bengali calendar	−923 – −922
Berber calendar	621
Buddhist calendar	215
Burmese calendar	−967
Byzantine calendar	5179–5180
Chinese calendar	庚寅年 (Metal Tiger); 2368 or 2161 — to — 辛卯年 (Metal Rabbit); 2369 or 2162
Coptic calendar	−613 – −612
Discordian calendar	837
Ethiopian calendar	−337 – −336
Hebrew calendar	3431–3432
- Hindu calendars
Vikram Samvat	−273 – −272
Shaka Samvat	N/A
Kali Yuga	2771–2772
Holocene calendar	9671
Iranian calendar	951 BP – 950 BP
Islamic calendar	980 BH – 979 BH
Javanese calendar	N/A
Julian calendar	N/A
Korean calendar	2004
Minguo calendar	2241 before ROC 民前2241年
Nanakshahi calendar	−1797
Thai solar calendar	213–214
Tibetan calendar	ལྕགས་ཕོ་སྟག་ལོ་ (male Iron-Tiger) −203 or −584 or −1356 — to — ལྕགས་མོ་ཡོས་ལོ་ (female Iron-Hare) −202 or −583 or −1355

Year 330 BC was a year of the pre-Julian Roman calendar. At the time, it was known as the Year of the Consulship of Crassus and Venno (or, less frequently, year 424 Ab urbe condita). The denomination 330 BC for this year has been used since the early medieval period, when the Anno Domini calendar era became the prevalent method in Europe for naming years.

== Events ==
=== By place ===
==== Macedonian Empire ====
- January 20 – Alexander the Great defeats the Persians, led by satrap Ariobarzanes, at the Persian Gates. In this battle, Ariobarzan, supported by only 700 Persian Immortals, holds the vast Macedonian army of 17,000 men at bay for 30 days. At the end, his troops are surrounded by Alexander's army, because of a Persian shepherd, who leads it around the Persian defenses. However, instead of surrendering, Ariobarzan and his 700 Immortals fight to the last man. Some historians consider him to be the Leonidas of Persia.
- January 30 – After gaining the Pass of the Persian Gates, Alexander enters Persepolis. There he ceremonially burns down the palace of Xerxes I, as a symbol that the Panhellenic war of revenge is at an end.
- Before continuing his pursuit of Darius III, who has retreated into Bactria, Alexander assembles all the Persian treasure and entrusts it to Harpalus, who is to hold it at Ecbatana as chief treasurer. Parmenion is also left behind in Media to manage communications between Alexander and the rest of his rapidly growing lands.
- Alexander appoints Atropates as the satrap of Media while Mithrenes is appointed by Alexander as satrap of Armenia.
- Crossing the Elburz Mountains to the Caspian Sea, Alexander seizes Zadracarta in Hyrcania and receives the submission of a group of satraps and Persian notables, some of whom he confirms in their offices. He then travels westward and defeats the Mardi, a mountain people who inhabit the Elburz Mountains. He also accepts the surrender of Darius' Greek mercenaries.
- In Aria, Alexander's army defeats the satrap Satibarzanes, who initially offers to submit, only to later revolt. Alexander then founds the town of Alexandria of the Arians (modern Herat).
- At Phrada, in Drangiana, Philotas, Parmenion's son and commander of the elite Macedonian companion cavalry, is implicated in an alleged plot against Alexander's life. He is condemned by the army, and executed. A secret message is sent by Alexander to Cleander, Parmenion's second in command, who obediently kills Parmenion at Ecbatana in Media for fear that he will rise up in revolt at the news of his son's death. All of Parmenion's adherents are now eliminated and men close to Alexander are promoted.

==== Persian Empire ====
- July 17 – King Darius III is deposed and killed by Bessus, the satrap of Bactria. Bessus assumes the kingship as Artaxerxes V.

==== Macedonia ====
- Alexander's regent in Macedonia, Antipater, makes peace with the Thracians (with whom he has been warring) and then marches south with a large force of over 40,000 men. He wins a hard-fought Battle of Megalopolis in Arcadia against Agis III of Sparta and his Greek mercenaries. Agis III is killed, and Spartan resistance is broken.
- Aeschines continues to try to prevent Demosthenes from being awarded a golden crown for his services to Athens. The case, which has begun in 336 BC, finally concludes with the overwhelming defeat of Aeschines, largely because of Demosthenes' brilliant speech for Ctesiphon (On the Crown).
- Following his defeat in the courts by Demosthenes, Aeschines leaves Athens for Rhodes, to teach rhetoric.

==== Roman Republic ====
- The Italian cities of Fondi and Privernum, led by Vitruvius Vaccus, launch a failed revolt against Rome.

=== By topic ===
==== Art ====
- Lysippos makes a bronze statue called The scraper (Apoxyomenos) (approximate date). A Roman copy after the original statue is today kept at Musei Vaticani in Rome.

== Deaths ==
- Agis III, Eurypontid king of Sparta (killed in battle)
- Darius III, king of Persia, was killed in Bactria (b. c. 380 BC)
- Kidinnu, Chaldean astronomer and mathematician
- Parmenion (also Parmenio), Macedonian general (murdered) (b. c. 400 BC)
- Philotas, Macedonian officer and son of Parmenio (executed)
- Theopompus of Chios, Greek historian and rhetorician (b. c. 380 BC)
