= For the Megalopolitans =

Oration by Demosthenes, delivered c. 352 BC

"For the Megalopolitans" (Ancient Greek: Ὑπὲρ τῶν Μεγαλοπολιτῶν) was one of the first political orations of the prominent Athenian statesman and orator Demosthenes. According to Dionysius of Hallicarnassus, it was delivered in 353/2 BC.

In 353/2 BC, Sparta endeavored to reestablish its preeminence in the Peloponnese and to undo Epaminondas' achievements. Because of Thebes' war with the Phocians, Spartans thought that they could easily overturn Arcadia's independence. Therefore, they sent troops to Megalopolis, which asked for Athens' support and military assistance. Sparta tried also to gain Athens' alliance, promising to help the Athenians to seize Oropos. The Ecclesia convened in order to take the final decision and Demosthenes was among those who expressed their opinion.

In For the Megalopolitans, Demosthenes argues for the Athenians to give the Megalopolis the support it requested against Spartan aggression. He argues that it is in the Athenian interest to prevent Sparta from conquering Megalopolis, as this would bring them closer to regaining control over the Peloponnese. Proposing such a policy, he bluntly opposed Eubulus's faction, which was against any military excursion. Demosthenes, on the other hand, sought for the restoration of Athens' glory and, for this purpose, he believed that his city should participate in military conflicts around Greece, recreating strong alliances and reinstating itself as an hegemony. Demosthenes' arguments did not convince the Assembly, and his advice was rejected. Sparta went on to attack Megalopolis, which was supported by its allies including other Peloponnesian states as well as Thebes.

== Works cited ==
- Trevett, Jeremy (2011), Demosthenes, Speeches 1–17, Austin: University of Texas Press
