= Tydeus of Chios =

Greek Politician

Tydeus of Chios (in Greek: Τῡδεύς ὁ Χῖος) was an ancient Greek politician.

He was one of the leaders of the democratic party of Chios and one of those who were executed in 412 BC by the Spartan commander of Chios, Pedaritus (or Pedaeretus), on the charge of "Atticism" - loyalty to the Athenian alliance - according to Thucydides.

He was possibly the son of the tragic poet Ion of Chios.

Under the supervision of Pedaritus, Chios was governed by anti-Athenians, and when the small political faction of Tydeus was suspected of favoring the Athenians, its leader and several of his associates were executed.

== Bibliography ==
- Thucydides, History of the Peloponnesian War. Book VIII
- Smith, William. A Dictionary of Greek and Roman biography and mythology. (1867) Vol. III. Boston: Little, Brown & Co. p. 1195. Illustrated by numerous engravings on wood.
- Bruce, I. A. F. (1964). Chios and “Psi” 1304. Phoenix 18 (4): 277. doi:https://doi.org/10.2307/1086361
