= 339th =

339th may refer to:

- 339th Aviation Detachment, United States Army Aviation Branch
- 339th Bombardment Group, unit of the New York Air National Guard
- 339th Bombardment Squadron, inactive United States Air Force unit
- 339th Fighter Group, unit of the United States Air Forces during World War II
- 339th Flight Test Squadron, United States Air Force unit
- 339th Infantry Regiment (United States), infantry regiment of the United States Army
- 339th Rifle Division (Soviet Union), formed in 1941 as a standard Red Army rifle division at Rostov-on-Don
- 339th Transportation Company (Direct Support), United States Army and Transportation Corps
- 339th Troop Carrier Squadron, component of the 419th Operations Group

== See also ==
- 339 (number)
- 339, the year 339 (CCCXXXIX) of the Julian calendar
- 339 BC
