= 382nd =

382nd or 382d may refer to:

- 382d Bombardment Group, inactive United States Air Force unit
- 382d Bombardment Squadron, unit of the Maine Air National Guard 101st Air Refueling Wing located at Bangor Air National Guard Base, Bangor, Maine
- 382d Fighter Squadron or 62d Expeditionary Reconnaissance Squadron, provisional United States Air Force unit
- 382nd Infantry Regiment (United States), infantry regiment in the United States Army

== See also ==
- K. 382d, canon for three voices in B-flat major, now thought to be the work of Wenzel Trnka, not Wolfgang Amadeus Mozart
- 382 (number)
- 382, the year 382 (CCCLXXXII) of the Julian calendar
- 382 BC
