= 3:33 =

3:33 may refer to:

- 3:33 (album), a 2004 album by Zug Izland
- 3:33 (film), a 2021 Indian Tamil-language psychological horror film
- 3:33, a 2020 album by Debi Nova

== See also ==
- 333 (disambiguation)
- 3:33am, a 2017 album by Amber Mark
