= Theorica =

The Theorica (Ancient Greek: τὰ θεωρικά), also called the Theoric Fund or Festival Fund, was the name for the fund of monies in ancient Athens expended on festivals, sacrifices, and public entertainments of various kinds. The fund was, in certain circumstances, also distributed among the people in the shape of largesses from the state.

== History ==
There were, according to Xenophon, more festivals at Athens than in all the rest of Greece. Besides those open to the whole body of the people, there were many confined to the members of each tribe, deme, and house. These last were provided for out of the private funds of the community who celebrated them. At the most important of the public festivals, there were not only sacrifices, but processions, theatrical exhibitions, gymnastic contests, and games, celebrated with great splendor and at a great expense.

Theorika was created or reinstated around 350 BCE, after the Social War (357–355 BC), by the Athenian statesman Eubulus, an administrator to the theorikon treasury sometime after 354/3 until Cephisophon of Aphidna replaced him in 343/2, and Diophantus. The Social War had plunged Athens into serious military and financial difficulties, thus creating an incentive to help the Athenian people by means of largesse. It was established to provide enough money for poorer Athenian citizens to be able to purchase tickets for yearly festivals of public worship and theatrical productions, such as the Dionysia, Panathenaea, Eleusinia and Thargelia. A portion of the expense of these festivals was paid by individuals as liturgies. For example, each City Dionysia, the eponymous archon selected a citizen to be a choregos for either one comedy or three tragedies together with a satyr-play. These choregoi were expected to pay for the entire cost of the training and performance of the play(s). In 410, a choregos for tragedy spent 3000 drachmas on the set of plays allocated to them, in a time when 1 drachma was the daily wage of a skilled worker in Athens. The rest of the financial burden was met by the public treasury. The religious embassies to Delos and other places, and especially those to the Olympian, Nemean, Isthmian, and Pythian Games, drew largely upon public funds, though a part of the cost fell upon the wealthier citizens who conducted them.

The amount of money contributed to this treasury varied between “15 talents or less and not much under 100 talents”. In an epitome (Dem. 1 hyp. 5) of Demosthenes’ First Olynthiac, a scholar named Libanius explains that in Athens there were no stone seats (only wooden benches) at the Theatre of Dionysus, and also originally no charge for admissions into the festival. Due to the lack of seating available, fights would break out as everyone rushed to find a bench; the leaders of the community decided to charge an admissions fee of two obols to prevent further violence. The fee was paid to the lessee of the theater (called Θεατρώνης, Θεατροπώλης, or ἀρχιτέκτων) who undertook to keep it in good repair, and constantly ready for use, on condition of being allowed to receive the profits. But because poorer citizens could not afford to pay for admittance, Athens established a fund that covered the costs of their tickets. Each citizen was allotted one drachma to cover the ticket cost of two obols (διωβελία) on each day of the three-day Dionysia. The payments would differ depending on the fluctuations of the state treasury and how many days the festivals lasted.

This payment continued to be exacted after the stone theater was built. Pericles, to relieve the poorer classes, passed a law that enabled them to receive the price of admission from the state; after which all those citizens who were too poor to pay for their places applied for the money in the public assembly, which was then frequently held in the theater.

In time this donation was extended to other entertainments besides theatrical ones: the sum of two obols being given to each citizen who attended; if the festival lasted two days, four obols; and if three, six obols; but not beyond that. Hence all theoric largesses received the name of diobelia (διωβελία). The sums thus given varied at different times, and of course depended on the state of the public treasury. These distributions of money, like those of grain and flour, were called dianomai (διανομαί), or diadoseis (διαδόσεις). They were often made at the Dionysia, when the allies were present, and saw the surplus of their tribute distributed from the orchestra. The appetite of the people for largesses grew by encouragement, stimulated from time to time by designing demagogues; and in the time of Demosthenes they seem not to have been confined to the poorer classes. The German classical scholar August Böckh calculated that from 25 to 30 talents were spent upon them annually.

== The Theoric Board ==
In the earlier times no person or group was expressly appointed to manage the Theoric fund. The money thus appropriated was disbursed by the Hellenotamiai. After the anarchy, the largess system having been restored by Agyrrhius, a board of managers was appointed, possibly consisting of ten men, who were called by many names (including ἀρχὴ ἐπὶ τῷ θεωρικῷ, οἱ ἐπὶ τῷ θεωρικὸν τεταγμέμοι or κεχειροτονημένοι, θεωρικὴ ἀρχὴ). They were elected by show of hands at the period of the great Dionysia, one from each tribe, and served four-year terms. In the time of Eubulus many other branches of the administration were placed under the control of this board, such as the management of the civil expenditure, the office of the Apodektai, and the building of docks, arsenals, and streets. This was dictated by an anxiety on the part of the people that no part of the revenue should be improperly diverted from the Theoric fund, which they thought would be prevented by increasing the powers of its managers. But these extraordinary powers appear not to have been of long continuance.

As public revenue greatly increased in the Athenian state, so too did the Theoric administration; according to Demosthenes there was an increase to as much as 400 talents a year from a previous amount of 130 talents (Phil. iv 37–8). As a result of this growth the Theoric Board began to extend itself into a powerful position over other public works, activities and boards that were supervised by the βουλή (Council of Five Hundred). The boule had previously controlled the state revenue and the expenditures, as well as the appropriations of monies to the magistrates, with the help of the different boards: the poletai (Auctions Board) and the apodektai (Board of Receivers). When the Theoric administration rose in power and worked together with the boule, it put the administration in a position where “it must have had a fair chance of securing for itself the lion’s share of the appropriations and possibly supplementing this share by a surplus”. The powerful position also enabled its board members to acquire confidential knowledge, information once only shared among those in the boule, on the activities of other departments. This weakened the monopoly of the boule and, as a result, the Theoric officials were able to gain supreme financial insight and replace the boule as the main resource of finances. Men seeking popularity in Athens recognized this growth of power and influence as a source of great opportunity, and eventually the Theoric Board eclipsed and absorbed all other financial offices. Utilizing this power, the Theoric Board proceeded to oversee the leasing of mines, the financing of expensive public works, such as roads and buildings, and money for the Athenian navy. Aeschines scornfully describes this new monopoly of power in his speech Against Ctesiphon:

...they [the Theoric Board] also controlled the dockyards, had charge of the naval arsenal that was building, and were Superintendents of Streets; almost the whole administration of the state was in their hands. (3.25)

== Demosthenes, Philip II, and the Stratiotika ==
Before the theorika was established, the Stratiotika (τὰ στρατιωτικά), or Military (Stratiotic) Fund, received any remaining surplus revenue if Athens was at war; this provided financing for military expenditures. But immediately after the Social War, all surplus revenue was allotted to the theorika until Demosthenes fought to have it redirected back to the stratiotika in 339/8. Demosthenes was a strong proponent in the fight against the rising power of Philip II of Macedon and believed that all surplus monies should be used for military campaigns rather than for domestic public works; Eubulus, on the other hand, was very much against expensive foreign expeditions. After the Social War Eubulus and his followers, the “peace party”, believed that the Athenian αρχή was no more, so they used the theorika to “restrain the demos from rash imperialistic adventures” and to convince the people that peace was beneficial. The theorika had become, in a sense, a psychological tool for this political party to repress the war mentality by exploiting the selfishness of the Athenians. It was also a “crucial factor in the process of shaping and distorting perceptions”, which might explain the denial of Philip as an immediate threat, and also why the Athenians were more thorough in their organizations of festivals than with their own military (Dem. Phil. i 35–6). In the First Olynthiac, delivered in 349 BCE, Demosthenes complains that Athens has the means to fight Philip but would rather use its money for pleasure:

Such are my views on the expeditionary force. With regard to the supply of money, you have money, men of Athens; you have more than any other nation has for military purposes. But you appropriate it yourselves, to suit your own pleasure. Now if you will spend it on the campaign, you have no need of a further supply; if not, you have--or rather, you have no supply at all. ‘What!’ someone will cry, ‘do you actually move to use this money for military purposes?’ Of course I do not. Only it is my opinion that we must provide soldiers and that there must be one uniform system of pay in return for service. Your opinion, however, is that you should, without any trouble, just appropriate the money for your festivals. Then the only alternative is a war-tax, heavy or light, as circumstances demand. Only money we must have, and without money nothing can be done that ought to be done. There are other proposals before you for raising supplies; choose whichever of them you think expedient, and, while there is yet time, grapple with the problem. (19-20)

Meanwhile, a protective law had been passed in Athens illegalizing proposals on the use of the money in the theorika, especially if the suggestions were contradictory to the purpose of the fund (merismos). Demosthenes’ caution when approaching the topic of the theorika in the First Olynthiac proves that such a law was in existence. Also during this time, in the face of either resisting Philip to retrieve their possessions or betraying their allies and losing them, their cleruchies and the Thracian Chersonese, Apollodorus of Acharnae proposed in the boule (in which he was a member in 348 BCE) that the Athenian people should decide whether the surplus should be used for the theorika or the stratiotika (Dem. 59.4 Against Neaera). The vote was unanimous that the money should be used for the stratiotika against Philip, but, because this type of proposition was still illegal, Apollodorus found himself being indicted by Stephanos of Eroiadai, who drew up a graphe paranomon (γραφή παρανόμων) against him; he was ultimately fined one talent and his decree was made null and void. Following this vote, Eubulus threatened death to anyone who tried to put the interests of the theorika below that of the stratiotika, making the act a capital offense. After Apollodorus’ indictment and Eubulus’ new law, Demosthenes openly suggested in his Third Olynthiac, a speech delivered in 349 BCE in lieu of Philip's hostilities against Olynthus, that the state get rid of the theorika because of its hampering effect upon their current crisis. He also asked to eliminate military exemptions for those who ran the Dionysian festivals in Athens, as it was demoralizing for the men who wished to serve their country:

In plain language I mean the laws for administering the Theoric Fund, and also some of the service regulations. The former distribute the military funds as theatre-money among those who remain in the city; the latter give impunity to deserters and in consequence discourage those willing to serve. When you have repealed these laws and made the way safe for wise counsel, then look round for someone who will propose what you all know to be salutary measures. But until you have done this, do not expect to find a statesman who will propose measures for your benefit, only to be ruined by you for his pains. You will never find one, especially as the only result would be that the proposer would get into trouble without improving the situation, and his fate would also make good advice more dangerous for the future. Yes, men of Athens, and you ought to insist that those who made these laws should also repeal them. (3.10-11)

The idea of demoralization is echoed by Libanius. Instead of being paid wages for serving in the army and enduring the dangers of warfare, Athenian citizens preferred to stay home and attend the religious festivals. Eubulus posed an argument two years after the First Olynthiac that the Athenians had to accept peace with Philip (the Peace of Philocrates, which Aeschines supported), otherwise they would have to go to the Piraeus, pay a war-tax (eisphora) to finance the fleet and transfer the money from the theorika to the stratiotika (Dem. On the False Embassy 19.291). Eubulus had laid out the different options for the Athenians: they could accept peace with Philip or, if they chose to continue the war, they would have to support it using their own means of financing. Demosthenes’ goal, by criticizing the theorika, was to snap the Athenians out of their denial and mistaken beliefs so that they could recognize the “absurd contradiction between domestic priorities and external exigencies, between the comfortable illusion of peace and the growing crisis in the north.”

By the Fourth Philippic Demosthenes’ attitude towards the theorika was changing:

Now there is also another matter, the misrepresentation of which by unfair obloquy and in intemperate language is injuring the State, and furthermore is affording a pretext for those who are unwilling to perform any of their duties as citizens; indeed, you will find that in every case where a man has failed to do his duty, this has been given as the excuse. I am really afraid to speak on this subject, but I will do so nevertheless; for I think I shall be able, with advantage to the State, to plead the cause both of the poor against the rich and of the property-owners against the necessitous. If we could banish from our midst both the obloquy which some heap upon the Theoric Fund, and also the fear that the Fund will not be maintained without doing a great deal of harm, we could not perform a greater service nor one more likely to strengthen the whole body politic. (4.35-37)

Demosthenes’ political party, the “war party”, had always “traditionally (especially in the great days of the Empire) been interventionist externally but ‘Athens-first’ internally.” Seeing that the theorika was crucial to preserving social peace in Athens (Demades, in Plutarch's Mor. 1011b, referred to it as the “glue of the democracy”), he needed to appeal to both worlds as an impartial arbiter. In the Fourth Philippic he speaks on behalf of the poor in Athens, reminding the wealthy, who criticized the theorika at its inception, that when the public revenue did not exceed 130 talents a year they remained dutiful and paid their property taxes. With the growth of revenue reaching 400 talents a year, the wealthy no longer felt the weight of financial responsibility upon their shoulders and it was of his opinion that the poor should be able to profit from the increase as well (Phil. iv 37–9).

In 339 BCE the situation in Athens became much more alarming than in 348 when Philip had attacked Olynthus and its allies, a matter Athens (excluding Demosthenes) did not consider an immediate threat. In 339 Philip had seized Elateia in Phocis, which was a closer and more serious danger to Athens. Demosthenes did not have any trouble persuading the Assembly to allocate all the public funds to the stratiotika and Philochorus, in a fragment preserved by Dionysius of Halicarnassus (ad Ammaeus 1.11), further illustrates Demosthenes’ success:

The people, after listening to the letter [a letter of allegations Philip made against the Athenians] and to the exhortations of Demosthenes, who advocated war and framed the necessary resolutions, passed a resolution to demolish the column erected to record the treaty of peace and alliance with Philip, and further to man a fleet and in every other way to prosecute the war energetically.

== The diminishment of the Theorika ==
The fact that Demosthenes did not face charges for breaking Eubulus’ law suggests that he was able to have the law repealed sometime around 339. In the year 337/6 Demosthenes became the head of the theorika and donated 10,000 drachmas of his own money (Aesch. 3.24) while revenues were being funneled to the stratiotika; but his donations lasted only one year. Upon the reinstitution of the theorika he attempted, through private gifts and a large festival, to make up for the privileges the Athenians had lost after adopting his financial policy. Shortly after Demosthenes’ promotion the Theoric Board was weakened by the law of Hegemon, which prohibited men from holding offices for more than four years; before this law, Theoric officials could be elected over and over again in successive terms. Hegemon was a member of the opposition party along with Aeschines and Demades, and it is difficult to determine a political reason behind his law other than it was “an intended slap at Demosthenes”. Lycurgus had also become a rival for the boule's control over finances and climbed the ladder of power until he assumed jurisdiction over the state's treasury in 337/6 as the Controller of Finances (ὁ ἐπὶ τῆς διοικήσεως), which the Theoric Board had previously monopolized. He governed this seat for twelve consecutive years until 326/5 when his and Demosthenes’ rival, Menesaichmus, took over the position.

Despite its diminishment of powers, the Theoric Board existed in some way or another up until Aristotle's Athenian Constitution (326-323 BCE). Lycurgus was using most of the state's income to pay for its defense, building projects, and religious festivals, which maintained some sense of the theorika's continuation in Athens. One of the last references to the theorika involved Demades’ notorious attempt at bribing the Athenians. In 331 King Agis III of Sparta persuaded Athens to join him in Sparta's revolt against Alexander. The Athenians begged Demades, who was then a member of the Theoric Board, to grant money to be used towards the deployment of triremes to aid in the rebellion. His response, as recorded in Plutarch's Morals (Praecepta Gerendae Reipublicae 818 E-F), was:

You have money, for I have made provision for the Festival of the Pitchers that each of you receive a half-mina; but if you prefer to use the money for this enterprise, use your own money for the Festival.

Demades’ bribery successfully kept the Athenians from taking up arms against Alexander.
