= Ctesiphon (disambiguation) =

Ctesiphon was a city in Mesopotamia that was intermittently the capital of the Arsacid and Sassanid Empires.

Ctesiphon may also refer to:

- Ctesiphon Arch, last remaining part of Ctesiphon city
- Ctesiphon of Vergium, a 1st-century missionary and the patron saint of Berja, Spain
- Ctesiphon (orator), an Athenian orator of the 4th century BCE
- Patriarchal Province of Seleucia-Ctesiphon, central ecclesiastical province of the Church of the East
