= 412 BC =

412 BC in various calendars
Gregorian calendar	412 BC; CDXII BC
Ab urbe condita	342
Ancient Egypt era	XXVII dynasty, 114
Pharaoh	Darius II of Persia, 12
Ancient Greek Olympiad (summer)	92nd Olympiad (victor)¹
Assyrian calendar	4339
Balinese saka calendar	N/A
Bengali calendar	−1005 – −1004
Berber calendar	539
Buddhist calendar	133
Burmese calendar	−1049
Byzantine calendar	5097–5098
Chinese calendar	戊辰年 (Earth Dragon); 2286 or 2079 — to — 己巳年 (Earth Snake); 2287 or 2080
Coptic calendar	−695 – −694
Discordian calendar	755
Ethiopian calendar	−419 – −418
Hebrew calendar	3349–3350
- Hindu calendars
Vikram Samvat	−355 – −354
Shaka Samvat	N/A
Kali Yuga	2689–2690
Holocene calendar	9589
Iranian calendar	1033 BP – 1032 BP
Islamic calendar	1065 BH – 1064 BH
Javanese calendar	N/A
Julian calendar	N/A
Korean calendar	1922
Minguo calendar	2323 before ROC 民前2323年
Nanakshahi calendar	−1879
Thai solar calendar	131–132
Tibetan calendar	阳土龙年 (male Earth-Dragon) −285 or −666 or −1438 — to — 阴土蛇年 (female Earth-Snake) −284 or −665 or −1437

Year 412 BC was a year of the pre-Julian Roman calendar. At the time, it was known as the Year of the Consulship of Ambustus and Pacilus (or, less frequently, year 342 Ab urbe condita). The denomination 412 BC for this year has been used since the early medieval period, when the Anno Domini calendar era became the prevalent method in Europe for naming years.

== Events ==
=== By place ===
==== Persian Empire ====
- The Persians under Darius II see their opportunity to play off one Greek city-state against another and to recover control of the Greek cities of Asia Minor, which have been under Athenian control since 449 BC. The satraps of Asia Minor, Tissaphernes and Pharnabazus, are ordered to collect overdue tribute.
- The Spartans sign a treaty of mutual help with the Persian satrap of Lower Asia, Tissaphernes. By the treaty of Miletus, Persia is given complete freedom in western Asia Minor in return for agreeing to pay for seamen to man the Peloponnesian fleet.

==== Greece ====
- Alcibiades helps stir up revolts amongst Athens' allies in Ionia, on the west coast of Asia Minor. However, Alcibiades loses the confidence of the Spartans and antagonises their king Agis II. As a result, he flees to the court of the Persian satrap Tissaphernes. Alcibiades advises Tissaphernes to withdraw his support from Sparta while conspiring with the oligarchic party in Athens, as Sparta's allied cities break away in a series of revolts.
- The Athenians vote to use their last reserves to build a new fleet.
- Clazomenae revolts against Athens. After a brief resistance, however, it again acknowledges the Athenian supremacy.
- An epidemic of an unknown disease hits Northern Greece.

==== Rome ====
- The epidemic hits the Roman Republic and causes a food shortage.

== Births ==
- Diogenes of Sinope
