= 333 BC =

333 BC in various calendars
- Gregorian calendar: 333 BC; CCCXXXIII BC
- Ab urbe condita: 421
- Ancient Egypt era: XXXI dynasty, 11
- Pharaoh: Darius III of Persia, 4
- Ancient Greek Olympiad (summer): 111th Olympiad, year 4
- Assyrian calendar: 4418
- Balinese saka calendar: N/A
- Bengali calendar: −926 – −925
- Berber calendar: 618
- Buddhist calendar: 212
- Burmese calendar: −970
- Byzantine calendar: 5176–5177
- Chinese calendar: 丁亥年 (Fire Pig); 2365 or 2158 — to — 戊子年 (Earth Rat); 2366 or 2159
- Coptic calendar: −616 – −615
- Discordian calendar: 834
- Ethiopian calendar: −340 – −339
- Hebrew calendar: 3428–3429
- Hindu calendars
- Vikram Samvat: −276 – −275
- Shaka Samvat: N/A
- Kali Yuga: 2768–2769
- Holocene calendar: 9668
- Iranian calendar: 954 BP – 953 BP
- Islamic calendar: 983 BH – 982 BH
- Javanese calendar: N/A
- Julian calendar: N/A
- Korean calendar: 2001
- Minguo calendar: 2244 before ROC 民前2244年
- Nanakshahi calendar: −1800
- Thai solar calendar: 210–211
- Tibetan calendar: མེ་མོ་ཕག་ལོ་ (female Fire-Boar) −206 or −587 or −1359 — to — ས་ཕོ་བྱི་བ་ལོ་ (male Earth-Rat) −205 or −586 or −1358

Year 333 BC was a year of the pre-Julian Roman calendar. At the time, it was known as the Year of the Dictatorship of Rufinus (or, less frequently, year 421 Ab urbe condita). The denomination 333 BC for this year has been used since the early medieval period, when the Anno Domini calendar era became the prevalent method in Europe for naming years.

== Events ==
- King Alexander of Macedonia conquers western Asia Minor, subduing the hill tribes of Lycia and Pisidia.
- King Darius III of Persia executes Charidemus, a Greek mercenary leader living in exile in Persia, for criticising preparations taken for the Battle of Issus.
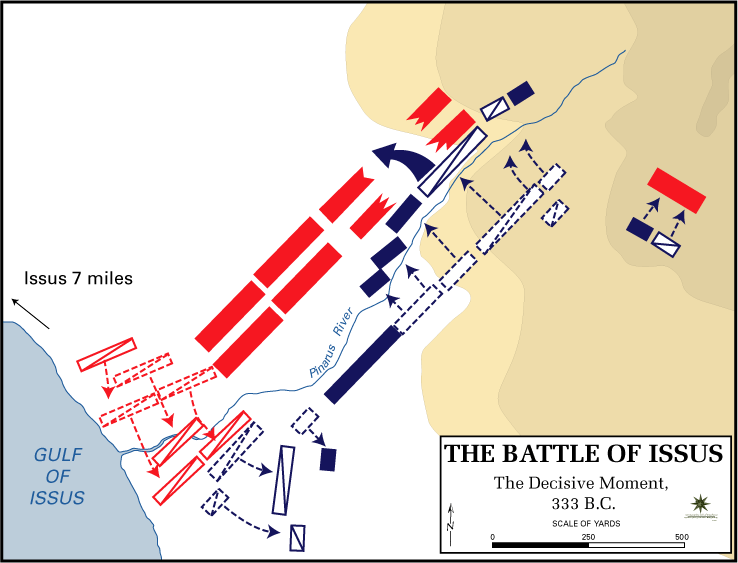
- The Battle of Issus
  Alexander has a great victory over the Persians in the Battle of the Issus River in Cilicia, but the Persian Emperor Darius III escapes. Darius leaves behind his wife, his two daughters, his mother Sisygambis.
- Alexander makes one of his officers, Nearchus, satrap of the newly conquered Lycia and Pamphylia in Anatolia and he appoints his general, Antigonus, satrap of Phrygia.
- From Issus, Alexander marches south into Syria and Phoenicia, his object being to isolate the Persian fleet from its bases and so to destroy it as an effective fighting force. The Phoenician cities of Marathus and Aradus do not resist Alexander's armies. Parmenion is sent ahead to try to secure Damascus and its rich booty, including Darius' war chest.
- After taking Byblos and Sidon, Alexander lays siege to Tyre.
- In reply to a letter from Darius offering peace, Alexander demands Darius' unconditional surrender.
- Nastasen, king of Kush repelled an invasion by an Egyptian leader named "Kambustan", likely the rebel leader Khabash and won many valuable war spoils including river faires.

== Deaths ==
- Charidemus, Greek mercenary leader
- Memnon of Rhodes, Greek mercenary leader (b. 380 BC)
