= 333 (disambiguation) =

333 is a year. (For BC, see 333 BC)

333 may also refer to:

- 333 (number)
- New York State Route 333
- 333 (Green Jellÿ album), 1994
- 333 (Bladee album), 2020
- 333 (Tinashe album), 2021
- 333 (Matuê album), 2024
- #333, an album by Paty Cantú
- "333" (song), a 2016 song by Against Me!
- "333", a 2006 song by The Velvet Teen from Cum Laude!
- "333", a 2024 song by Iniko from The Awakening
- 333 Badenia, an asteroid

== See also ==
- 3:33 (disambiguation)
