= 339 BC =

339 BC in various calendars
Gregorian calendar	339 BC; CCCXXXIX BC
Ab urbe condita	415
Ancient Egypt era	XXXI dynasty, 5
Pharaoh	Artaxerxes III of Persia, 5
Ancient Greek Olympiad (summer)	110th Olympiad, year 2
Assyrian calendar	4412
Balinese saka calendar	N/A
Bengali calendar	−932 – −931
Berber calendar	612
Buddhist calendar	206
Burmese calendar	−976
Byzantine calendar	5170–5171
Chinese calendar	辛巳年 (Metal Snake); 2359 or 2152 — to — 壬午年 (Water Horse); 2360 or 2153
Coptic calendar	−622 – −621
Discordian calendar	828
Ethiopian calendar	−346 – −345
Hebrew calendar	3422–3423
- Hindu calendars
Vikram Samvat	−282 – −281
Shaka Samvat	N/A
Kali Yuga	2762–2763
Holocene calendar	9662
Iranian calendar	960 BP – 959 BP
Islamic calendar	990 BH – 988 BH
Javanese calendar	N/A
Julian calendar	N/A
Korean calendar	1995
Minguo calendar	2250 before ROC 民前2250年
Nanakshahi calendar	−1806
Thai solar calendar	204–205
Tibetan calendar	阴金蛇年 (female Iron-Snake) −212 or −593 or −1365 — to — 阳水马年 (male Water-Horse) −211 or −592 or −1364

Year 339 BC was a year of the pre-Julian Roman calendar. At the time it was known as the Year of the Consulship of Mamercinus and Philo (or, less frequently, year 415 Ab urbe condita). The denomination 339 BC for this year has been used since the early medieval period, when the Anno Domini calendar era became the prevalent method in Europe for naming years.

== Events ==
=== By place ===
==== Greece ====
- Philip II of Macedon decides to attack the Scythians, using as an excuse their reluctance to allow Philip to dedicate a statue of Heracles at the Danube estuary. The two armies clash on the plains of modern-day Dobruja. The ninety-year-old King of the Scythians, Ateas, is killed during the battle and his army is routed.
- During a meeting of the Amphictyonic Council, Philip accuses the citizens of the town of Amfissa, in Locris, of intruding on consecrated ground. The Amphictyonic Congress, with the initial support of the Athenian representative, Aeschines, decides to inflict a harsh punishment upon the Locrians. After the failure of a first military excursion against the Locrians, the summer session of the Amphictyonic Council gives command of the league's forces to Philip and asks him to lead a second excursion. Philip acts at once, and his forces pass through Thermopylae, enter Amfissa and defeat the Locrians who are led by Chares, the Athenian general and mercenary commander.
- Xenocrates is elected as head of the Greek Academy replacing Speusippus.

==== Roman Republic ====
- The Roman consul Titus Manlius Imperiosus Torquatus defeats the Latins in the Battle of Trifanum.

== Births ==
- Alexinus, Greek philosopher of Elis (approximate date)

== Deaths ==
- Speusippus, head of Plato's Academy (b. 407 BC)
- Ateas, king of the Scythians (b. c. 429 BC)
