= 484 BC =

484 BC in various calendars
- Gregorian calendar: 484 BC; CDLXXXIV BC
- Ab urbe condita: 270
- Ancient Egypt era: XXVII dynasty, 42
- Pharaoh: Xerxes I of Persia, 2
- Ancient Greek Olympiad (summer): 74th Olympiad (victor)¹
- Assyrian calendar: 4267
- Balinese saka calendar: N/A
- Bengali calendar: −1077 – −1076
- Berber calendar: 467
- Buddhist calendar: 61
- Burmese calendar: −1121
- Byzantine calendar: 5025–5026
- Chinese calendar: 丙辰年 (Fire Dragon); 2214 or 2007 — to — 丁巳年 (Fire Snake); 2215 or 2008
- Coptic calendar: −767 – −766
- Discordian calendar: 683
- Ethiopian calendar: −491 – −490
- Hebrew calendar: 3277–3278
- Hindu calendars
- Vikram Samvat: −427 – −426
- Shaka Samvat: N/A
- Kali Yuga: 2617–2618
- Holocene calendar: 9517
- Iranian calendar: 1105 BP – 1104 BP
- Islamic calendar: 1139 BH – 1138 BH
- Javanese calendar: N/A
- Julian calendar: N/A
- Korean calendar: 1850
- Minguo calendar: 2395 before ROC 民前2395年
- Nanakshahi calendar: −1951
- Thai solar calendar: 59–60
- Tibetan calendar: མེ་ཕོ་འབྲུག་ལོ་ (male Fire-Dragon) −357 or −738 or −1510 — to — མེ་མོ་སྦྲུལ་ལོ་ (female Fire-Snake) −356 or −737 or −1509

Year 484 BC was a year of the pre-Julian Roman calendar. At the time, it was known as the Year of the Consulship of Mamercus and Vibulanus (or, less frequently, year 270 Ab urbe condita). The denomination 484 BC for this year has been used since the early medieval period, when the Anno Domini calendar era became the prevalent method in Europe for naming years.

== Events ==
=== By place ===
==== Persian Empire ====
- Xerxes I quells the Egyptian revolt against Persian rule. He ravages the Delta region in the process and then appoints his brother Achaemenes satrap (governor) of Egypt.
- Despite an attempt at rebellion, the land and city of Babylon remains solidly under Persian rule.

==== Greece ====
- The Athenian general and statesman, Xanthippus, is ostracised.
- Astylos of Croton wins the stadion race for a second time at the 74th Olympic Games.

==== Rome ====
- The Romans defeat the Volsci and Aequi in battle.
- Dedication of the Temple of Castor and Pollux

==== Literature ====
- The Athenian playwright, Aeschylus, wins first prize in drama at the Dionysia festival.

== Births ==
- Herodotus of Halicarnassus, Greek historian (approximate date) (died c. 425 BC)
- Achaeus of Eretria, Greek tragedian

== Deaths ==
- Wu Zixu, political advisor from Chu who has been employed at the court of the State of Wu during the reign of King Helü of Wu; all Chinese people with the surname Wu consider him their first ancestor (born 526 BC)
- Makkhali Gosala (according to historian Arthur Llewellyn Basham), Indian ascetic
