= 301 BC =

301 BC in various calendars
Gregorian calendar	301 BC; CCCI BC
Ab urbe condita	453
Ancient Egypt era	XXXIII dynasty, 23
Pharaoh	Ptolemy I Soter, 23
Ancient Greek Olympiad (summer)	119th Olympiad, year 4
Assyrian calendar	4450
Balinese saka calendar	N/A
Bengali calendar	−894 – −893
Berber calendar	650
Buddhist calendar	244
Burmese calendar	−938
Byzantine calendar	5208–5209
Chinese calendar	己未年 (Earth Goat); 2397 or 2190 — to — 庚申年 (Metal Monkey); 2398 or 2191
Coptic calendar	−584 – −583
Discordian calendar	866
Ethiopian calendar	−308 – −307
Hebrew calendar	3460–3461
- Hindu calendars
Vikram Samvat	−244 – −243
Shaka Samvat	N/A
Kali Yuga	2800–2801
Holocene calendar	9700
Iranian calendar	922 BP – 921 BP
Islamic calendar	950 BH – 949 BH
Javanese calendar	N/A
Julian calendar	N/A
Korean calendar	2033
Minguo calendar	2212 before ROC 民前2212年
Nanakshahi calendar	−1768
Seleucid era	11/12 AG
Thai solar calendar	242–243
Tibetan calendar	ས་མོ་ལུག་ལོ་ (female Earth-Sheep) −174 or −555 or −1327 — to — ལྕགས་ཕོ་སྤྲེ་ལོ་ (male Iron-Monkey) −173 or −554 or −1326

Year 301 BC was a year of the pre-Julian Roman calendar. At the time, it was known as the Year of the Dictatorship of Corvus (or, less frequently, year 453 Ab urbe condita). The denomination 301 BC for this year has been used since the early medieval period, when the Anno Domini calendar era became the prevalent method in Europe for naming years.

== Events ==
=== By place ===
==== Asia Minor ====
- In the Battle of Ipsus in Phrygia, the armies of Antigonus, the ruler of Syria, Asia Minor, Phoenicia and Judea, and his son Demetrius Poliorcetes are defeated by the forces of Lysimachus and Seleucus. Antigonus is killed in the battle.
- Antigonus' defeat and death secures Cassander's control of Macedonia. Through this victory, Lysimachus is able to add the greater part of Asia Minor to his European possessions while Seleucus now controls most of Syria. However, Demetrius is able to keep a foothold in Greece.

==== Seleucid Empire ====
- The southern part of Syria is occupied by Ptolemy.

== Deaths ==
- Antigonus I Monophthalmus, Macedonian general under Alexander the Great who founded and became the first king of the Macedonian dynasty of the Antigonids (b. 382 BC)
- Aristobulus of Cassandreia, Greek historian (b. ca. 375 BC)
