= Hellenotamiae =

Hellenotamiai (Attic Greek: ἑλληνοταμίαι) was an ancient Greek term indicating a group of public treasurers. The Hellenotamiae were ten magistrates appointed by the Athenians (one from each tribe, possibly by election) to receive the contributions of the allied states, and were the chief financial officers of the Delian League.

They were first appointed in 477 BC, when Athens, in consequence of the conduct of the Spartan general Pausanias, had obtained the command of the allied states. The money paid by the different states, which was originally fixed at 460 talents, was deposited in Delos, which was the place of meeting for the discussion of all common interests; and there can be no doubt that the Hellenotamiai not only received, but were also the guardians of these monies, which were called by Xenophon Hellenotamia (Ἑλληνοταμία).

The office was retained after the treasury was transferred from Delos to Athens in 454/453 BC, on the proposal of the Samians. From 453 BC they paid the First Fruits to the treasury of Athena, and disbursed payments on the authority of the assembly, usually to Athenian general on campaign, but also for construction (e.g. Acropolis buildings). Some time around the oligarchic coup of 411 BC, a board of twenty Hellenotamiae were given authority over the state treasury of Athens, as well as that of the Delian League.

The office was abolished on the conquest of Athens by the Peloponnesians in 404 BC. The Hellenotamiae were not reappointed after the restoration of the democracy; for which reason the grammarians give us little information regarding their responsibilities and duties. The German classical scholar August Boeckh, however, concluded from inscriptions that they were probably ten in number, chosen by lot (like the treasurers of the gods) out of the Pentacosiomedimni, and that they did not enter upon their office at the beginning of the year, but after the Panathenaea and the first Prytaneia. With regard to their duties, Böckh supposes that they remained treasurers of the monies collected from the allies, and that payments for certain objects were assigned to them. In the first place they would of course pay the expenses of wars in the common cause, as the contributions were originally designed for that purpose; but as the Athenians in course of time considered the money as their own property, the Hellenotamiai had to pay the Theorica and military expenses not connected with wars on behalf of the common cause.
