= On the Crown =

Demosthenes' greatest speech

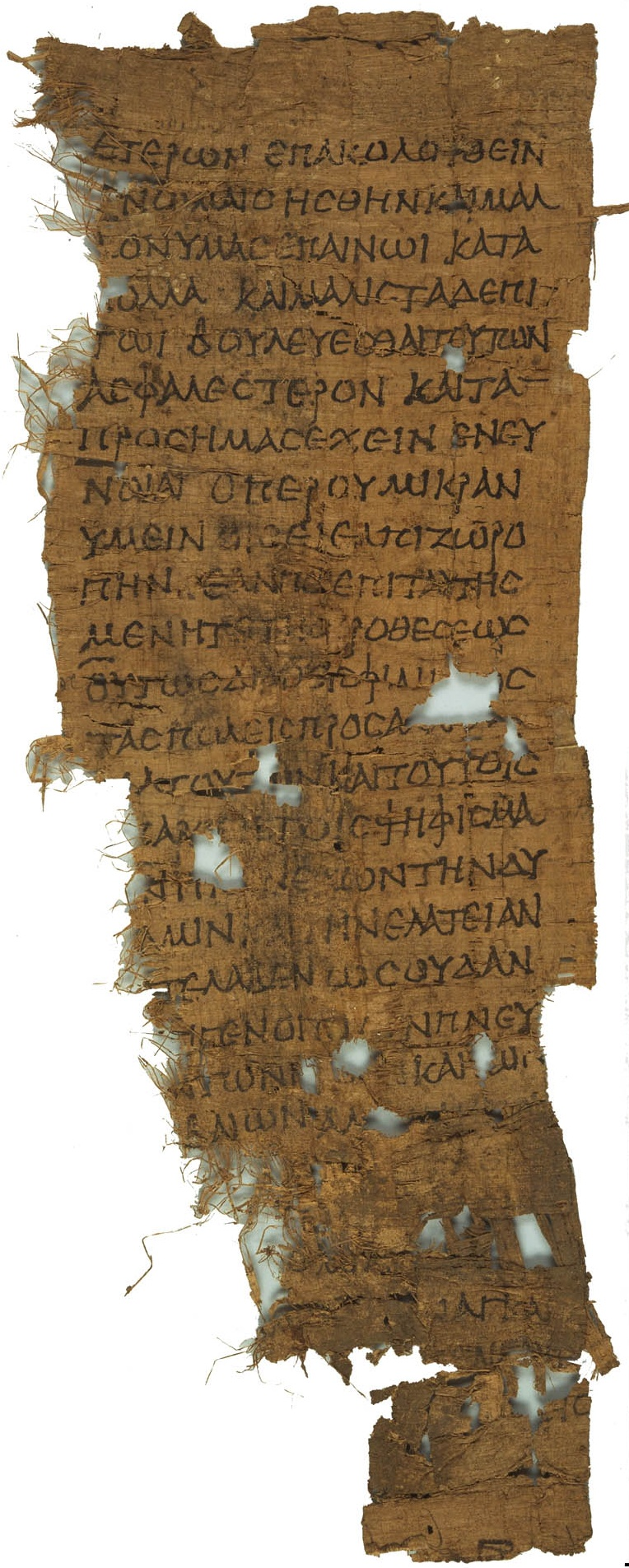
Demosthenes, De Corona 167–169. P. Oxy. 1377, 1st century BC

"On the Crown" (Ancient Greek: Ὑπὲρ Κτησιφῶντος περὶ τοῦ Στεφάνου, Hyper Ktēsiphōntos peri tou Stephanou) is the most famous judicial oration of the prominent Athenian statesman and orator Demosthenes, delivered in 330 BC.

== Historical background ==
Despite the unsuccessful ventures against Philip II of Macedon and Alexander the Great, the Athenian people still respected and admired Demosthenes, maybe even more than the pro-Macedonian politicians, especially Demades and Phocion, who ruled the city during this period. In 336 BC the orator Ctesiphon proposed that Athens honor Demosthenes for his services to the city by presenting him, according to custom, with a golden crown (stephane). This proposal became a political issue in 330 BC, and Aeschines prosecuted Ctesiphon for having violated the law on three points:

- For making false allegations in a state document.
- For unlawfully conferring a crown to a state official (Demosthenes) who had not yet rendered a report of his term of office.
- For unlawfully offering the crown at the Dionysia.

== Content of the speech ==
In On the Crown, which is considered one of the most splendid political pleas ever written, Demosthenes not only defended Ctesiphon but also attacked vehemently those who would have preferred peace with Macedon. In this trial, Demosthenes' entire political career was at issue, but the orator repudiated nothing of what he had done. He begins with a general view of the condition of Greece when he entered politics and describes the phases of his struggle against Philip. He then deals with the Peace of Philocrates and blames Aeschines for his role during the negotiations and the ratification of the treaty. He also launches a personal attack against Aeschines, whom he holds up to ridicule as born of low and infamous parents. To this he adds charges of corruption and treason, and attributes the disaster of Chaeronea to the conduct of his political opponent, when representing Athens in the council of the Amphictyonic League. He underscores that he alone stood up to promote a coalition with Thebes. The orator asserts that, although Athens was defeated, it was better to be defeated in a glorious struggle for independence, than to surrender the heritage of liberty.

Demosthenes finally defeated Aeschines by an overwhelming majority of votes. As a result, Ctesiphon was acquitted and Aeschines fined and forced into exile.

Many scholars have concluded that Aeschines's speech presented a very plausible, although not incontrovertible, legal case.

== Assessments ==
On the Crown has been termed "the greatest speech of the greatest orator in the world". Scholar Richard Claverhouse Jebb, analysing the oratorical contest between Demosthenes and Aeschines in 330 BC, underscores that this fierce debate illustrates the last great phase of political life at Athens. Noteworthy, the combat of eloquence attracted to Athens an immense concourse of spectators. "The theory of Greek eloquence had its final and its most splendid illustration in that trial which brought forth the two speeches On the Crown: nor could this part of our discussion conclude more fittingly than with an endeavour to call up some faint image of Demosthenes as in that great cause he stood opposed to Aeschines."
