= Euphemus (archon) =

Euphemus (Ancient Greek: Εύφημος) was archon of Athens in 417/416 BC. In Thucydides, he is given a speech which portrays Athens as a tyrannical city.

== Archonship ==
Euphemus gives his name to the year of his archonship in 417/416 BC. During his archonship, the Argive alliance with Athens is renewed and the Melian expedition is undertaken.

== Thucydides ==
His speech rendered in Thucydides, Book 6 (72-88.2), as Athenian ambassador to Camarina gives reply to Hermocrates the Syracusan: "Euphemus responds in terms that characterize all Athenian political strategy as an assessment of imperial expediency." Athens has become a tyrant.
