= 382 BC =

382 BC in various calendars
- Gregorian calendar: 382 BC; CCCLXXXII BC
- Ab urbe condita: 372
- Ancient Egypt era: XXIX dynasty, 17
- Pharaoh: Hakor, 12
- Ancient Greek Olympiad (summer): 99th Olympiad, year 3
- Assyrian calendar: 4369
- Balinese saka calendar: N/A
- Bengali calendar: −975 – −974
- Berber calendar: 569
- Buddhist calendar: 163
- Burmese calendar: −1019
- Byzantine calendar: 5127–5128
- Chinese calendar: 戊戌年 (Earth Dog); 2316 or 2109 — to — 己亥年 (Earth Pig); 2317 or 2110
- Coptic calendar: −665 – −664
- Discordian calendar: 785
- Ethiopian calendar: −389 – −388
- Hebrew calendar: 3379–3380
- Hindu calendars
- Vikram Samvat: −325 – −324
- Shaka Samvat: N/A
- Kali Yuga: 2719–2720
- Holocene calendar: 9619
- Iranian calendar: 1003 BP – 1002 BP
- Islamic calendar: 1034 BH – 1033 BH
- Javanese calendar: N/A
- Julian calendar: N/A
- Korean calendar: 1952
- Minguo calendar: 2293 before ROC 民前2293年
- Nanakshahi calendar: −1849
- Thai solar calendar: 161–162
- Tibetan calendar: ས་ཕོ་ཁྱི་ལོ་ (male Earth-Dog) −255 or −636 or −1408 — to — ས་མོ་ཕག་ལོ་ (female Earth-Boar) −254 or −635 or −1407

Year 382 BC was a year of the pre-Julian Roman calendar. At the time, it was known as the Year of the Tribunate of Crassus, Mugillanus, Cornelius, Fidenas, Camerinus and Mamercinus (or, less frequently, year 372 Ab urbe condita). The denomination 382 BC for this year has been used since the early medieval period, when the Anno Domini calendar era became the prevalent method in Europe for naming years.

== Events ==
=== By place ===
==== Greece ====
- The Spartan commander Phoebidas, who is passing through Boeotia on campaign, takes advantage of civil strife within Thebes to gain entrance to the city for his troops. Once inside, he seizes the Cadmeia (the citadel of Thebes), and forces the anti-Spartan party to flee the city. The government of Thebes is placed in the hands of the pro-Spartan party, backed by a Spartan garrison based in the Cadmeia. Many of the previous leaders of Thebes are driven into exile. Epaminondas, although associated with the anti-Spartan faction, is allowed to remain.
- Pelopidas, a Theban general and statesman, flees to Athens and takes the lead in attempts to liberate Thebes from Spartan control.
- In punishment for his unauthorized action in the previous year of taking over Thebes, Phoebidas is relieved of his command, but the Spartans continue to hold Thebes. The Spartan king Agesilaus II argues against punishing Phoebidas, on the grounds that his actions had benefited Sparta, and this was the only standard against which he ought to be judged.
- Evandrus takes over being Archon of Athens from Demonstrates.

== Births ==
- Philip II, king of Macedon (d. 336 BC), son of Amyntas III of Macedon and Eurydike of Lynkestis
- Antigonus I Monophthalmus (d. 301 BC), Macedonian general under Alexander the Great and king of Macedon 306-301

== Deaths ==
- Orontes I of Armenia (b. 425 BC), son of Artasyrus
