= 475 BC =

475 BC in various calendars
- Gregorian calendar: 475 BC; CDLXXV BC
- Ab urbe condita: 279
- Ancient Egypt era: XXVII dynasty, 51
- Pharaoh: Xerxes I of Persia, 11
- Ancient Greek Olympiad (summer): 76th Olympiad, year 2
- Assyrian calendar: 4276
- Balinese saka calendar: N/A
- Bengali calendar: −1068 – −1067
- Berber calendar: 476
- Buddhist calendar: 70
- Burmese calendar: −1112
- Byzantine calendar: 5034–5035
- Chinese calendar: 乙丑年 (Wood Ox); 2223 or 2016 — to — 丙寅年 (Fire Tiger); 2224 or 2017
- Coptic calendar: −758 – −757
- Discordian calendar: 692
- Ethiopian calendar: −482 – −481
- Hebrew calendar: 3286–3287
- Hindu calendars
- Vikram Samvat: −418 – −417
- Shaka Samvat: N/A
- Kali Yuga: 2626–2627
- Holocene calendar: 9526
- Iranian calendar: 1096 BP – 1095 BP
- Islamic calendar: 1130 BH – 1129 BH
- Javanese calendar: N/A
- Julian calendar: N/A
- Korean calendar: 1859
- Minguo calendar: 2386 before ROC 民前2386年
- Nanakshahi calendar: −1942
- Thai solar calendar: 68–69
- Tibetan calendar: ཤིང་མོ་གླང་ལོ་ (female Wood-Ox) −348 or −729 or −1501 — to — མེ་ཕོ་སྟག་ལོ་ (male Fire-Tiger) −347 or −728 or −1500

Year 475 BC was a year of the pre-Julian Roman calendar. In the Roman Republic, it was known as the Year of the Consulship of Poplicola and Rutilus (or, less frequently, year 279 Ab urbe condita). The denomination 475 BC for this year has been used since the early medieval period, when the Anno Domini calendar era became the prevalent method in Europe for naming years.

== Events ==
=== By place ===
==== Greece ====
- Cimon leads an Athenian attack on the island of Skyros and expels the indigenous inhabitants who are regarded as pirates.
- The first recorded eruption of Mount Etna occurs.

==== China ====
- King Yuan of Zhou becomes king of the Zhou dynasty.

=== By topic ===
==== Arts ====
- The painter Polygnotus of Thasos begins his work (approximate date).

== Births ==
- Philolaus, Greek philosopher (approximate year)

== Deaths ==
- Duke Ding of Jin, ruler of Jin in ancient China (r. 511–475 BC)
- Atossa, Achaemenid queen (approximate date)
