= Khabash =

Egyptian pharaoh of the 31st dynasty

- Khababash, Khabbash
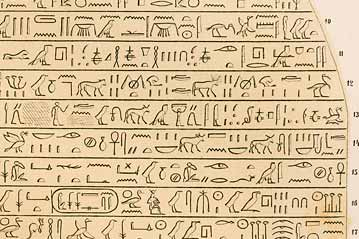
- Part of the Stela of Nastasen mentioning (row 13) the Egyptian invader Kambasuten (most likely Khabash)

Rebel Pharaoh
- Reign: c.338 – c.335 BC
- Predecessor: Artaxerxes III
- Successor: Artaxerxes IV or Darius III
Royal titulary
Prenomen
Senen-setepu-ni-ptah
Snn-stpw-nj-Ptḥ
Image [of Tatenen], chosen of Ptah

M23 X1 L2 X1	s M22 M22 n Q3 X1 V28 A40 U21
Nomen
Khabbash
Ḫbbš

G39 N5	M12 W10 E10 M8
- Dynasty: (?)

Khabash, also Khababash or Khabbash, was Pharaoh of Egypt in the 4th century BC. During the second Persian occupation of Egypt (343–332 BC), he led a revolt against the Persian rule for two or three years from ca. 338 BC, a few years before the conquest of Egypt by Alexander the Great.

Little is known about Khabash. His name is not Egyptian, and he may have been of Libyan or Nubian descent. He is referred to as "Lord of both lands", i.e. King of Upper and Lower Egypt, and as "Son of Ra", another pharaonic title, and given the throne name of Senen-setep-en-Ptah in a decree of Ptolemy Lagides, who later became King Ptolemy I Soter, dated to 312 BC.

Because the decree refers to "the enemy Xerxes", previously scholars thought that his revolt occurred in the reign of Xerxes I of Persia (486-465 BC). However the discovery of a demotic contract, dated to the first year of the reign of Khabash, proved that he lived shortly before 324 BC. The contract was written in Thebes in Upper Egypt, and the decree of Ptolemy says that Khabash went as king to Buto in Lower Egypt. Therefore it seems clear that Khabash really did have control over all, or almost all, of Egypt.

Sometime in the 330s BC, a ruler called Kambasuten – who may have been Khabash – led an invasion into the kingdom of Kush which was defeated by king Nastasen as recorded in a stela now in the Berlin museum. An Apis bull sarcophagus bearing his name was found in the Serapeum of Saqqara, dating to his second regnal year.
