= 280 BC =

280 BC in various calendars
Gregorian calendar	280 BC; CCLXXX BC
Ab urbe condita	474
Ancient Egypt era	XXXIII dynasty, 44
Pharaoh	Ptolemy II Philadelphus, 4
Ancient Greek Olympiad (summer)	125th Olympiad (victor)¹
Assyrian calendar	4471
Balinese saka calendar	N/A
Bengali calendar	−873 – −872
Berber calendar	671
Buddhist calendar	265
Burmese calendar	−917
Byzantine calendar	5229–5230
Chinese calendar	庚辰年 (Metal Dragon); 2418 or 2211 — to — 辛巳年 (Metal Snake); 2419 or 2212
Coptic calendar	−563 – −562
Discordian calendar	887
Ethiopian calendar	−287 – −286
Hebrew calendar	3481–3482
- Hindu calendars
Vikram Samvat	−223 – −222
Shaka Samvat	N/A
Kali Yuga	2821–2822
Holocene calendar	9721
Iranian calendar	901 BP – 900 BP
Islamic calendar	929 BH – 928 BH
Javanese calendar	N/A
Julian calendar	N/A
Korean calendar	2054
Minguo calendar	2191 before ROC 民前2191年
Nanakshahi calendar	−1747
Seleucid era	32/33 AG
Thai solar calendar	263–264
Tibetan calendar	ལྕགས་ཕོ་འབྲུག་ལོ་ (male Iron-Dragon) −153 or −534 or −1306 — to — ལྕགས་མོ་སྦྲུལ་ལོ་ (female Iron-Snake) −152 or −533 or −1305

Year 280 BC was a year of the pre-Julian Roman calendar. At the time it was known as the Year of the Consulship of Laevinus and Coruncanius (or, less frequently, year 474 Ab urbe condita). The denomination 280 BC for this year has been used since the early medieval period, when the Anno Domini calendar era became the prevalent method in Europe for naming years.

== Events ==
=== By place ===
==== Seleucid Empire ====
- Antiochus makes his eldest son, Seleucus, king in the east, but he proves to be incompetent.
- Antiochus is compelled to make peace with his father's murderer and King of Macedon, Ptolemy Keraunos, abandoning, for the time being, his plans to control Macedonia and Thrace.
- Nicomedes, King of Bithynia, is threatened with an invasion from Antiochus who has already made war upon his father, Zipoites. Antiochus actually invades Bithynia but withdraws again without risking a battle.
- Antiochus is unable to bring under his control the Persian dynasties that rule in Cappadocia.
- Antiochus is defeated by Egypt's Ptolemy II in the Damascene War.

==== Greece ====
- Pyrrhus makes an alliance with Ptolemy Keraunos, King of Macedon. This allows him to go to southern Italy with his army.
- The Achaean League is reformed by twelve towns in the northern Peloponnesus and will later grow to include non-Achaean cities. It has two generals, a federal council with proportional representation of members and an annual assembly of all free citizens. The League achieves a common coinage and foreign policy and the member cities pool their armed forces.
- Rhodes, rising in prosperity, becomes head of an Island League and helps to keep the peace and freedom of the Greek islands in the Aegean Sea.
- The Colossus of Rhodes is completed by the sculptor Chares of Lindos after twelve years' work. A giant statue of the Greek god Helios, it is the last completed of the seven wonders of the ancient world. It stands 70 cubits tall (over 30 metres or 100 feet), making it the tallest statue of the ancient world.

==== Roman Republic ====
- Responding to an appeal from Tarentum, King Pyrrhus of Epirus uses his army of over 20,000 men against the Romans. In the Battle of Heraclea he defeats a Roman army led by consul Publius Valerius Laevinus. Pyrrhus's judicious use of his elephants plays a large part in his victory. Several tribes including the Lucani, Bruttii and the Messapians as well as the Greek cities of Crotone and Locri join Pyrrhus.
- Roman commander and statesman, Gaius Fabricius Luscinus, is sent to negotiate the ransom and exchange of prisoners. Pyrrhus is so impressed by Fabricius refusing to accept a bribe, that Pyrrhus releases the prisoners without the requirement of a ransom. Following his victory, Pyrrhus advances as far north as Latium.

==== China ====
- General Sima Cuo of the State of Qin attacks the State of Chu, conquering the western region of Qianzhong by marching through the region of Bashu. This conquest makes it easier for future Qin armies to invade Chu.
- General Bai Qi of Qin attacks the State of Zhou and captures the city of Guanglang.

=== By topic ===
==== Astronomy ====
- Aristarchus of Samos uses the size of the Earth's shadow on the Moon to estimate that the Moon's radius is one-third that of the Earth. He proposes, for the first time, a heliocentric view of the Solar System, but is ignored due to the lack of evidence of the Earth's motion.

== Births ==
- Han Fei, Chinese philosopher who has developed Xun Zi's philosophy (approximate date)
- Li Si, influential prime minister (or chancellor) of the feudal state and later of the dynasty of Qin (approximate date) (d. 208 BC)
- Philo of Byzantium, a Greek writer on mechanics (approximate date) (d. c. 220 BC)

== Deaths ==
- Demetrius of Phaleron (or Demetrius Phalereus), Athenian orator, statesman, and philosopher, who has become prominent at the court of Ptolemy I, enjoying a high reputation as an orator (b. c. 350 BC)
- Herophilus, Alexandrian physician who has been an early performer of public dissections on human cadavers; often called the father of anatomy (b. c. 335 BC)
