= 336 BC =

336 BC in various calendars
- Gregorian calendar: 336 BC; CCCXXXVI BC
- Ab urbe condita: 418
- Ancient Egypt era: XXXI dynasty, 8
- Pharaoh: Darius III of Persia, 1
- Ancient Greek Olympiad (summer): 111th Olympiad (victor)¹
- Assyrian calendar: 4415
- Balinese saka calendar: N/A
- Bengali calendar: −929 – −928
- Berber calendar: 615
- Buddhist calendar: 209
- Burmese calendar: −973
- Byzantine calendar: 5173–5174
- Chinese calendar: 甲申年 (Wood Monkey); 2362 or 2155 — to — 乙酉年 (Wood Rooster); 2363 or 2156
- Coptic calendar: −619 – −618
- Discordian calendar: 831
- Ethiopian calendar: −343 – −342
- Hebrew calendar: 3425–3426
- Hindu calendars
- Vikram Samvat: −279 – −278
- Shaka Samvat: N/A
- Kali Yuga: 2765–2766
- Holocene calendar: 9665
- Iranian calendar: 957 BP – 956 BP
- Islamic calendar: 986 BH – 985 BH
- Javanese calendar: N/A
- Julian calendar: N/A
- Korean calendar: 1998
- Minguo calendar: 2247 before ROC 民前2247年
- Nanakshahi calendar: −1803
- Thai solar calendar: 207–208
- Tibetan calendar: ཤིང་ཕོ་སྤྲེ་ལོ་ (male Wood-Monkey) −209 or −590 or −1362 — to — ཤིང་མོ་བྱ་ལོ་ (female Wood-Bird) −208 or −589 or −1361

Year 336 BC was a year of the pre-Julian Roman calendar. At the time, it was known as the Year of the Consulship of Crassus and Duillius (or, less frequently, year 418 Ab urbe condita). The denomination 336 BC for this year has been used since the early medieval period, when the Anno Domini calendar era became the prevalent method in Europe for naming years.

== Events ==
=== By place ===
==== Achaemenid Empire ====
- The young king of Persia, Arses, objects to being controlled by Bagoas and attempts to poison him. Instead, Arses and all his children are killed by Bagoas.
- Bagoas then seeks to install a new monarch who will be easier to control. He chooses Codomannus, a distant relative of the royal house, who takes the name Darius III. When Darius tries to assert his independence from Bagoas' control, Bagoas attempts to poison him, but the king is warned and forces Bagoas to drink the poison himself.

==== Macedonia ====
- Following Philip II of Macedon's marriage to Eurydice, Alexander and his mother, Olympias, flee to Epirus, with Alexander later moving to Illyria. However, shortly afterward, father and son are reconciled and Alexander returns; but his position as heir is tenuous.
- Macedonian troops, commanded by Parmenion, trusted lieutenant of Philip II, arrive in Asia Minor, but are driven back by Persian forces under the command of the Greek mercenary Memnon of Rhodes.
- At a grand celebration of his daughter Cleopatra's marriage to Alexander I of Epirus (brother of Olympias), Philip II is assassinated at Aegae by Pausanias of Orestis, a young Macedonian bodyguard with a bitter grievance against the young queen's uncle Attalus and against Philip for denying him justice. Pausanias is killed on the spot.
- Following his assassination, Philip II of Macedon is succeeded by his son Alexander III. Suspecting the princes of the Lynkestis region of killing Phillip II, Alexander executes them all. The League of Corinth promotes Alexander to general of a unified Greek army for its planned invasion of Asia Minor.
- Alexander immediately has Amyntas IV, son of King Perdiccas III and his cousin, executed.
- Alexander puts down a rebellion in Macedonia and crushes the rebellious Illyrians. He then appears at the gates of Thebes and receives the city's submission. After that he advances to the Corinthian isthmus and is elected by the assembled Greeks as their commander against Persia.
- Conscription is introduced in Athens. Young men are required to perform duties which are part military and part civic.
- Aeschines brings a suit against Ctesiphon for illegally proposing the award of a crown to the Athenian leader Demosthenes in recognition of his services to Athens.

== Deaths ==
- Amyntas IV, usurper king of Macedon
- Arses, King of Persia
- Attalus, Macedonian general (b. c. 390 BC)
- Bagoas, Vizier of Persia
- Eurydice, 7th wife of Philip II, queen of Macedonia
- Pausanias of Orestis, personal bodyguard of Philip II of Macedon
- Philip II, King of Macedonia (b. 382 BC)
