= 449 BC =

449 BC in various calendars
Gregorian calendar	449 BC; CDXLIX BC
Ab urbe condita	305
Ancient Egypt era	XXVII dynasty, 77
Pharaoh	Artaxerxes I of Persia, 17
Ancient Greek Olympiad (summer)	82nd Olympiad, year 4
Assyrian calendar	4302
Balinese saka calendar	N/A
Bengali calendar	−1042 – −1041
Berber calendar	502
Buddhist calendar	96
Burmese calendar	−1086
Byzantine calendar	5060–5061
Chinese calendar	辛卯年 (Metal Rabbit); 2249 or 2042 — to — 壬辰年 (Water Dragon); 2250 or 2043
Coptic calendar	−732 – −731
Discordian calendar	718
Ethiopian calendar	−456 – −455
Hebrew calendar	3312–3313
- Hindu calendars
Vikram Samvat	−392 – −391
Shaka Samvat	N/A
Kali Yuga	2652–2653
Holocene calendar	9552
Iranian calendar	1070 BP – 1069 BP
Islamic calendar	1103 BH – 1102 BH
Javanese calendar	N/A
Julian calendar	N/A
Korean calendar	1885
Minguo calendar	2360 before ROC 民前2360年
Nanakshahi calendar	−1916
Thai solar calendar	94–95
Tibetan calendar	ལྕགས་མོ་ཡོས་ལོ་ (female Iron-Hare) −322 or −703 or −1475 — to — ཆུ་ཕོ་འབྲུག་ལོ་ (male Water-Dragon) −321 or −702 or −1474

Year 449 BC was a year of the pre-Julian Roman calendar. At the time, it was known as the Third year of the decemviri and the Year of the Consulship of Potitus and Barbatus (or, less frequently, year 305 Ab urbe condita). The denomination 449 BC for this year has been used since the early medieval period, when the Anno Domini calendar era became the prevalent method in Europe for naming years.

== Events ==
=== By place ===
==== Greece ====
- The Greek city-states make peace with the Persian Empire through the Peace of Callias, named after Callias II, the chief Greek ambassador to the Persian Court, an Athenian who is a brother-in-law of Cimon. Athens agrees to end its support for the Egyptian rebels still holding out in parts of the Nile Delta, while the Persians agree not to send ships of war into the Aegean Sea. Athens now effectively controls all the Greek city states in Ionia.
- Pericles begins a great building plan including the re-fortification of Athens main port Piraeus and its long walls extending to Athens main city.
- Pericles proposes the "Papyrus Decree" allowing the use of 5,000 talents to finance the massive rebuilding program of Athenian temples. This leads to a meeting ("Congress") of all Greek states in order to consider the question of rebuilding the temples destroyed by the Persians. The Congress fails because of Sparta's opposition.
- Pericles places the Athenian sculptor Phidias in charge of all the artistic aspects of his reconstruction program. Construction begins on the Temple of Hephaestus in Athens, while the Athenian Senate commissions Callicrates to construct a temple to Athena Nike on the Acropolis.
- The Second Sacred War erupts between Athens and Sparta, when Sparta forcefully detaches Delphi from Phocis and renders it independent.

==== Rome ====
- The Law of the Twelve Tables (developed by the Decemvirates) is formally promulgated in 450 B.C. The Twelve Tables are literally drawn up on twelve ivory tablets which are posted in the Forum Romanum so that all Romans can read and know them.
- When the Decemvirate's term of office expires, the decemviri refuse to leave office or permit successors to take office. Appius Claudius Crassus is said to have made an unjust decision which would have forced a young woman named Verginia into prostitution, prompting her father to kill her. This leads to an uprising against the Decemvirate forcing the decemviri to resign their offices. The ordinary magistrates (magistratus ordinarii) are re-instituted. Appius Claudius is said to have committed suicide as a result of these events.

=== By topic ===
==== Literature ====
- Herodotus completes his History, which records the events concerning the Persian War.

== Deaths ==
- Appius Claudius Crassus, former decemvir (suicide)
