= Vitruvius Vaccus =

Roman revolt leader (d. 330 BC)

Marcus Vitruvius Vaccus (d. 330 BC) was a citizen of Fondi, and the leader of the revolt of the Fundani and Privernates against Rome in 330 BC.

He was a man of considerable reputation both in his own state and also at Rome, where he had a house on the Palatine Hill. The consul Lucius Papirius Crassus was sent to quell the revolt, which he effected without difficulty. On the capture of Privernum, Vaccus fell into the consul's hands, and was put to death after his triumph. His property was confiscated to the state, his house on the Palatine destroyed, and the site on which it stood was ever after called the Prata Vacci.
