= 412 BC epidemic =

Disease outbreak in Ancient Greece and Rome

The 412 BC epidemic of an unknown disease, often identified as influenza, was reported in Northern Greece by Hippocrates and in Rome by Livy.

== Symptoms ==
Hippocrates named a wide variety of symptoms, among them: fever, coughing, pain in head and neck, and emaciation. The disease proved fatal most often among prepubescent children.

== Pandemic by Country ==
=== Greece ===
Hippocrates described an influenza like sickness in his "Book of Epidemics," which he states is called the "fever of Perinthus" or "cough of Perinthus". Hippocrates described a winter and spring epidemic of an upper respiratory tract infection happening annually in Perinthus. There is scientific disagreement on whether the pandemic was influenza or diphtheria, with Émile Littré notably posing an opposition to the influenza diagnosis.

=== Rome ===
The disease outbreak caused a food shortage in the Roman Republic, and a famine was only prevented with food relief from Sicily and Etruria, and via trade missions to the "peoples round about who dwelt on the Tuscan sea or by the Tiber."
