= Ateas =

Scythian king (c. 429 BC – 339 BC)

Ateas (ca. 429 BC – 339 BC) was described in Greek and Roman sources as the most powerful king of Scythia, who lost his life and empire in the conflict with Philip II of Macedon in 339 BC. His name also occurs as Atheas, Ateia, Ataias, and Ateus.

== Unification of Scythia ==
It is not certain if Ateas was connected to the royal dynasty of Scythia; most historians view him as an usurper who ousted other Scythian kings from power and eliminated the traditional tripartite division of Scythian society. By the 340s, he had united under his power Scythian tribes inhabiting a vast territory between the Danube and the Maeotian marshes. His purported capital was excavated by Soviet archaeologists near the town of Kamianka on the Dnieper.

Plutarch relates several anecdotes about the character of Ateas and his attitude toward Greek culture: "Ateas took prisoner Ismenias, an excellent piper, and commanded him to play; and when others admired him, he swore it was more pleasant to hear a horse neigh... Ateas wrote to Philippus: You reign over the Macedonians, men that have learned fighting; and I over the Scythians, which can fight with hunger and thirst".

== Conflict with Macedon ==
Towards the end of his life, Ateas increasingly encroached upon the Greek-Macedonian sphere of influence in the Balkans. Greek sources record his campaign against the tribe of the Histriani in Thrace. At first Ateas found it prudent to enlist the assistance of Macedon. When Philip's troops arrived to Scythia, they were dismissed with derision: the king of the Histriani had died and military action was no longer on the agenda. Another collision between Philip and Ateas arose during the former's siege of Byzantium, when the Scythians refused to provide Macedonian troops with supplies, citing the barrenness of their land as a pretext.

These petty conflicts with Ateas gave Philip a ground for invading his dominions. The final straw was the Scythians' reluctance to allow Philip to dedicate a statue of Heracles at the Danube estuary. In 339 BC, the two armies clashed on the plains of modern-day Dobruja. Ateas was killed in action and his army was routed. Philip seems to have been wounded as well and his horse was killed in the thick of the fray.

Peace was bought at the price of concession of 20,000 Scythian women and as many steppe mares to the Macedonians. In the wake of this defeat, the empire of Ateas fell to pieces. The Scythians are presumed to have lost their dominant position in the Pontic steppe for two centuries, until the reign of Scilurus in the 2nd century BC.
