= 425 BC =

425 BC in various calendars
Gregorian calendar	425 BC; CDXXV BC
Ab urbe condita	329
Ancient Egypt era	XXVII dynasty, 101
Pharaoh	Artaxerxes I of Persia, 41
Ancient Greek Olympiad (summer)	88th Olympiad, year 4
Assyrian calendar	4326
Balinese saka calendar	N/A
Bengali calendar	−1018 – −1017
Berber calendar	526
Buddhist calendar	120
Burmese calendar	−1062
Byzantine calendar	5084–5085
Chinese calendar	乙卯年 (Wood Rabbit); 2273 or 2066 — to — 丙辰年 (Fire Dragon); 2274 or 2067
Coptic calendar	−708 – −707
Discordian calendar	742
Ethiopian calendar	−432 – −431
Hebrew calendar	3336–3337
- Hindu calendars
Vikram Samvat	−368 – −367
Shaka Samvat	N/A
Kali Yuga	2676–2677
Holocene calendar	9576
Iranian calendar	1046 BP – 1045 BP
Islamic calendar	1078 BH – 1077 BH
Javanese calendar	N/A
Julian calendar	N/A
Korean calendar	1909
Minguo calendar	2336 before ROC 民前2336年
Nanakshahi calendar	−1892
Thai solar calendar	118–119
Tibetan calendar	阴木兔年 (female Wood-Rabbit) −298 or −679 or −1451 — to — 阳火龙年 (male Fire-Dragon) −297 or −678 or −1450

Year 425 BC was a year of the pre-Julian Roman calendar. At the time, it was known as the Year of the Tribunate of Atratinus, Medullinus, Cincinnatus and Barbatus (or, less frequently, year 329 Ab urbe condita). The denomination 425 BC for this year has been used since the early medieval period, when the Anno Domini calendar era became the prevalent method in Europe for naming years.

== Events ==
=== By place ===
==== Persian Empire ====
- Artaxerxes I, Achaemenid king of Persia, is succeeded by his son Xerxes II.

==== Greece ====
- Aristophanes produces the comedy, Archanians.
- Demosthenes captures and fortifies the port of Pylos in the Peloponnesus, giving Athens a strong base close to Sparta. Meanwhile, a Spartan army, commanded by Brasidas, lands on the nearby island of Sphacteria, but is repulsed by the Athenians. An Athenian fleet summoned by Demosthenes bottles up the Spartan navy in Navarino Bay.
- Cleon joins Demosthenes in the invasion by Athenian troops of Sphacteria. The resulting Battle of Pylos results in an Athenian victory leading to the surrender of many of the Spartan troops. Pylos remains in Athenian hands, and is used as a base for raids into Spartan territory and as a refuge for fleeing Spartan helots.
- Following the failure of peace negotiations between Athens and Sparta, a number of Spartans stranded on the island of Sphacteria after the Battle of Pylos are attacked by an Athenian force under Cleon and Demosthenes. The resulting Battle of Sphacteria leads to a further victory by the Athenians over the Spartans. The Spartans sue for peace, but the Athenian leader Cleon persuades Athens to refuse.

==== China ====
- Zhou wei lie wang becomes king of the Zhou dynasty of China.

=== By topic ===
==== Architecture ====
- Callicrates starts to build the Temple of Athena Nike on the Acropolis in Athens (approximate date). Between 410 and 407 BC the temple is surrounded by a parapet.

==== Art ====
- What some historians call the Rich style begins in Greece.

==== Literature ====
- Euripides' play Hecuba is performed.
- Aristophanes' play The Acharnians is performed. Produced by Callistratus, it wins Aristophanes a first prize at the Lenaea.

== Births ==
- Artaxerxes III, king of the Persian Empire (approximate date)

== Deaths ==
- Artaxerxes I, king of the Persian Empire
- Herodotus of Halicarnassos, Dorian Greek historian (b. 484 BC)
