= 400 BC =

400 BC in various calendars
- Gregorian calendar: 400 BC; CD BC
- Ab urbe condita: 354
- Ancient Egypt era: XXVIII dynasty, 5
- Pharaoh: Amyrtaeus, 5
- Ancient Greek Olympiad (summer): 95th Olympiad (victor)¹
- Assyrian calendar: 4351
- Balinese saka calendar: N/A
- Bengali calendar: −993 – −992
- Berber calendar: 551
- Buddhist calendar: 145
- Burmese calendar: −1037
- Byzantine calendar: 5109–5110
- Chinese calendar: 庚辰年 (Metal Dragon); 2298 or 2091 — to — 辛巳年 (Metal Snake); 2299 or 2092
- Coptic calendar: −683 – −682
- Discordian calendar: 767
- Ethiopian calendar: −407 – −406
- Hebrew calendar: 3361–3362
- Hindu calendars
- Vikram Samvat: −343 – −342
- Shaka Samvat: N/A
- Kali Yuga: 2701–2702
- Holocene calendar: 9601
- Iranian calendar: 1021 BP – 1020 BP
- Islamic calendar: 1052 BH – 1051 BH
- Javanese calendar: N/A
- Julian calendar: N/A
- Korean calendar: 1934
- Minguo calendar: 2311 before ROC 民前2311年
- Nanakshahi calendar: −1867
- Thai solar calendar: 143–144
- Tibetan calendar: ལྕགས་ཕོ་འབྲུག་ལོ་ (male Iron-Dragon) −273 or −654 or −1426 — to — ལྕགས་མོ་སྦྲུལ་ལོ་ (female Iron-Snake) −272 or −653 or −1425

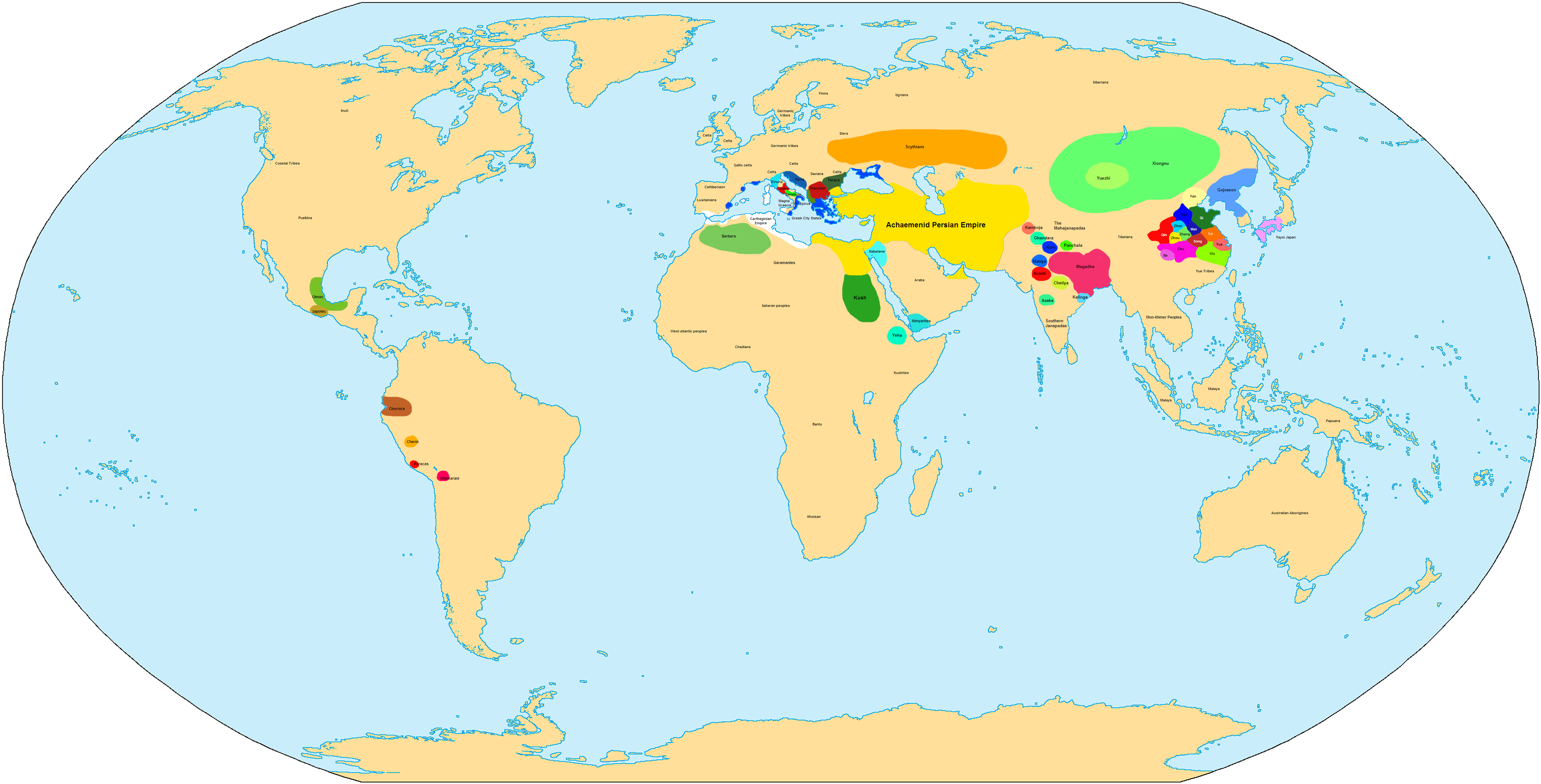
Map of the world in 400 BC.

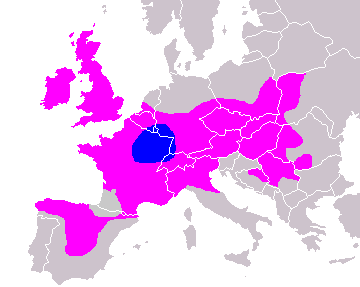
Celtic influence in Europe 400 BC (blue and purple).

Year 400 BC was a year of the pre-Julian Roman calendar. In the Roman Republic, it was known as the Year of the Tribunate of Esquilinus, Capitolinus, Vulso, Medullinus, Saccus and Vulscus (or, less frequently, year 354 Ab urbe condita). The denomination 400 BC for this year has been used in Europe since the early medieval period, when the Anno Domini calendar era became prevalent there.

== Events ==
=== By place ===
- Artaxerxes II, king of Persia, appoints Tissaphernes to take over all the districts in Asia Minor over which Artaxerxes II's brother Cyrus had been governor before his revolt.
- Tamõs, the satrap of Ionia, fled from his satrapy in fear of the king's retribution. He loaded his possessions onto his satrapy's fleet of triremes and sailed to Egypt seeking the protection of Psammetichus, the King of the Egyptians. Psammetichus executed Tamõs and his family and took his possessions and fleet for himself.
- When the Greek cities of Ionia heard about Cyrus' defeat they knew Artaxerxes would want to exact his revenge on them for supporting Cyrus. They sent several embassies to Sparta to request the Lacedaemonians assistance. The Spartans sent Thibron who recruits 5,000 soldiers to aid the Ionian Greeks.
- Thibron embarks his army at the Isthmus of Corinth and sails to Ephesus on the Ionian coast. Upon arrival, he recruits an additional 2,000 soldiers and starts his campaign against Tissaphernes.
- Xenophon's "Ten Thousand" make their way back to Greece, with most of the men enlisting with the Spartans. Xenophon's successful march through the Persian Empire encourages Sparta to turn on the Persians and begin wars against the Persians in Asia Minor.
- With the outbreak of the war between Sparta and the Persians, the Athenian admiral, Conon, obtains joint command, with Pharnabazus, of a Persian fleet.
- War breaks out between Sparta and Elis.
- London has its origins on a rise above marshy waters at the point where the Walbrook joins the River Thames. The Celtic king, Belin, rebuilds an earth wall surrounding a few dozen huts and orders a small landing place to be cut into the south side of the wall, along the river front, where a wooden quay is built (approximate date).
- Amyrtaeus of Sais successfully completes a revolt against Persian control by gaining control of all of Upper Egypt.
- The Olmec culture in Mesoamerica comes to an end as its city of La Venta is abandoned (approximate date).
- San Lorenzo Tenochtitlán is abandoned (approximate date).
- The Bianzhong of the Marquis Yi of Zheng are cast.
- India had the biggest epic on earth - The Mahabharata.

=== By topic ===
- The catapult is invented by Greek engineers.
- The Mature classical period of sculpture ends in Ancient Greece and is succeeded by the fourth-century (Late Classical) period (approximate date).
- Theodorus from Phokaia in Asia Minor, builds the Tholos of Delphi, the sanctuary of Athena Pronaia in Delphi (approximate date).
- Dionysius I, Greek tyrant of Syracuse, confiscates gold and silver coins and re-mints them, keeping the weight the same but changing the denomination from one to two drachmae — the first known official devaluation at the expense of the general population. A virulent inflation ensues (approximate date).
- Zoroastrianism becomes the faith of many Persians. The Zoroastrians believe in a struggle between their god, Mazda, and the devil. They believe that the birth of their founder, the prophet Zarathustra, was the beginning of a final epoch that is to end in an Armageddon and triumph of good over evil.
- Brahmanism starts evolving in Hinduism, a process which takes place over the following 200 years (approximate date).

== Births ==
- Antipater, a Macedonian general (d. 319 BC).
- Parmenion, Macedonian general under Alexander the Great (d. 330 BC).

== Deaths ==
- Aspasia of Miletus, widow of Pericles of Athens (approximate date) (b. c. 470 BC)
- Siddhārtha Gautama (also known as Buddha), founder of Buddhism (approximate date)
- Thucydides, Greek historian (approximate date) (b. c. 460 BC)
