= Demades =

Athenian orator and demagogue

Demades (Ancient Greek: Δημάδης Δημέου Παιανιεύς, romanized: Dēmádēs Dēméou Paianieús, c. 380 – c. 318 BC) was an Athenian orator and demagogue.

== Background and early life ==
Demades was born into a poor family of ancient Paeania and was employed at one time as a common sailor, but he rose to a prominent position at Athens thanks to his eloquence as well as his unscrupulous character. He espoused the cause of Philip II of Macedon in the war against Olynthus, and was thus brought into bitter and lifelong enmity with Demosthenes, whom he at first supported.

== Relations with Macedon ==
Demades fought against the Macedonians in the Battle of Chaeronea, and was taken prisoner. Having made a favourable impression upon Philip, he was released together with his fellow-captives, and was instrumental in bringing about a treaty of peace between Macedonia and Athens.

Demades continued to be a favourite of Alexander, and, prompted by a bribe, saved Demosthenes and some other Athenian orators from his vengeance. It was also chiefly owing to him that Alexander, after the destruction of Thebes, treated Athens leniently.

Demades' conduct in supporting the Macedonian cause, yet receiving any bribes that were offered by the opposite party, led him to be heavily fined more than once; he was finally deprived of his civil rights. He was reinstated (322 BC) on the approach of Antipater, to whom he was sent as ambassador. Before setting out he persuaded the citizens to pass sentence of death upon Demosthenes and his followers, who had fled from Athens. The result of his embassy was the conclusion of a peace considered to be greatly to the disadvantage of the Athenians.

In 318 BC (or earlier), having been discovered involved in an intrigue with Perdiccas, Antipater's opponent, Demades was put to death by Antipater at Pella, when entrusted with another mission by the Athenians.

Demades was avaricious and unscrupulous, but he was a highly gifted and practised orator. According to Arrian, Demades was killed by Cassander, Antipater's son, after suffering the slaughtering of his child in his hands. Cassander justified his actions by accusing Demades that he had slandered Antipater in his letters to Perdiccas.

== Legacy ==
It has been said of Demades that he was a master improviser. This may explain why practically none of his works have fully survived and only scattered fragments have been preserved.

A fragment of a speech, bearing his name, in which he defends his conduct, is to be found in C Müller's Oratores Attici, ii. 438, but its genuineness is considered to be doubtful.

The saying that "Draco's laws were written with blood, not with ink" is attributed to Demades.

He is also alleged to have called the state largesse distributed by the Theoric Fund the "cement of democracy".

== Bibliography ==
- Brun, Patrice (2000). L'orateur Démade : essai d'histoire et d'historiographie. Pessac: Ausonius. ISBN 978-2910023225.
- Habicht, Christian (1989). "Zwei athenische Volksbeschlüsse". Chrion. 19: 1–5.
- Lambert, Stephen D. (2011). Lambert, Stephen D. (ed.). Sociable man : essays on ancient Greek social behaviour in honour of Nick Fisher. Swansea: Classical Press of Wales. pp. 204–205. ISBN 978-1905125517.
