= 405 BC =

405 BC in various calendars
- Gregorian calendar: 405 BC; CDV BC
- Ab urbe condita: 349
- Ancient Egypt era: XXVII dynasty, 121
- Pharaoh: Darius II of Persia, 19
- Ancient Greek Olympiad (summer): 93rd Olympiad, year 4
- Assyrian calendar: 4346
- Balinese saka calendar: N/A
- Bengali calendar: −998 – −997
- Berber calendar: 546
- Buddhist calendar: 140
- Burmese calendar: −1042
- Byzantine calendar: 5104–5105
- Chinese calendar: 乙亥年 (Wood Pig); 2293 or 2086 — to — 丙子年 (Fire Rat); 2294 or 2087
- Coptic calendar: −688 – −687
- Discordian calendar: 762
- Ethiopian calendar: −412 – −411
- Hebrew calendar: 3356–3357
- Hindu calendars
- Vikram Samvat: −348 – −347
- Shaka Samvat: N/A
- Kali Yuga: 2696–2697
- Holocene calendar: 9596
- Iranian calendar: 1026 BP – 1025 BP
- Islamic calendar: 1058 BH – 1057 BH
- Javanese calendar: N/A
- Julian calendar: N/A
- Korean calendar: 1929
- Minguo calendar: 2316 before ROC 民前2316年
- Nanakshahi calendar: −1872
- Thai solar calendar: 138–139
- Tibetan calendar: ཤིང་མོ་ཕག་ལོ་ (female Wood-Boar) −278 or −659 or −1431 — to — མེ་ཕོ་བྱི་བ་ལོ་ (male Fire-Rat) −277 or −658 or −1430

Year 405 BC was a year of the pre-Julian Roman calendar. At the time, it was known as the Year of the Tribunate of Barbatus, Capitolinus, Cincinnatus, Medullinus, Iullus and Mamercinus (or, less frequently, year 349 Ab urbe condita). The denomination 405 BC for this year has been used since the early medieval period, when the Anno Domini calendar era became the prevalent method in Europe for naming years.

== Events ==
=== By place ===
==== Greece ====
- After their victory in the Battle of Arginusae over the Spartans, the Athenian fleet follows the reappointed Spartan admiral, Lysander, to the Hellespont. The Athenian fleet under Admiral Conon is destroyed by the Spartans under Lysander in the Battle of Aegospotami in the Sea of Marmara and Conon flees to Cyprus.
- The Spartan king Pausanias lays siege to Athens while Lysander's fleet blockades Piraeus. This action closes the grain route through the Hellespont, thereby starving Athens.
- While the Peloponnesians besiege Athens, Theramenes tries to negotiate with Lysander. He is away for three months while Athens is being reduced to starvation. Then he heads the embassy that negotiates the terms of capitulation to the Spartans.

==== Sicily ====
- Dionysius the Elder rises to power as the tyrant of Syracuse. He makes peace with the Carthaginian general, Himilco (whose army has been weakened by the plague), and fortifies Syracuse. This treaty leaves Carthage in control of most of Sicily.
- Dionysius the Elder ruthlessly consolidates and expands his power. He builds a wall around Syracuse and fortifies Epipolae. The Greek citizens of Naxos, Catana, and Leontini are removed from their cities; many of them are enslaved and their homes are given to Sicilian and Italian mercenaries. Dionysius prepares his army to fight against Carthage, which now occupies western and southern Sicily.

=== By topic ===
==== Drama ====
- January – Aristophanes' The Frogs is first performed, winning first prize at the Lenaia festival.
- March/April – Euripides' The Bacchae and Iphigeneia at Aulis are performed posthumously as part of a tetralogy at the City Dionysia festival and win first prize.

==== Art ====
- The Erechtheum, which includes The Porch of Maidens (Caryatid Porch), is completed in the Ionian style on the Acropolis in Athens after 16 years of construction.

== Deaths ==
- Philolaus, Greek mathematician and philosopher (approximate date) (b. c. 480 BC)
