= 407 BC =

407 BC in various calendars
Gregorian calendar	407 BC; CDVII BC
Ab urbe condita	347
Ancient Egypt era	XXVII dynasty, 119
Pharaoh	Darius II of Persia, 17
Ancient Greek Olympiad (summer)	93rd Olympiad, year 2
Assyrian calendar	4344
Balinese saka calendar	N/A
Bengali calendar	−1000 – −999
Berber calendar	544
Buddhist calendar	138
Burmese calendar	−1044
Byzantine calendar	5102–5103
Chinese calendar	癸酉年 (Water Rooster); 2291 or 2084 — to — 甲戌年 (Wood Dog); 2292 or 2085
Coptic calendar	−690 – −689
Discordian calendar	760
Ethiopian calendar	−414 – −413
Hebrew calendar	3354–3355
- Hindu calendars
Vikram Samvat	−350 – −349
Shaka Samvat	N/A
Kali Yuga	2694–2695
Holocene calendar	9594
Iranian calendar	1028 BP – 1027 BP
Islamic calendar	1060 BH – 1059 BH
Javanese calendar	N/A
Julian calendar	N/A
Korean calendar	1927
Minguo calendar	2318 before ROC 民前2318年
Nanakshahi calendar	−1874
Thai solar calendar	136–137
Tibetan calendar	阴水鸡年 (female Water-Rooster) −280 or −661 or −1433 — to — 阳木狗年 (male Wood-Dog) −279 or −660 or −1432

Year 407 BC was a year of the pre-Julian Roman calendar. At the time, it was known as the Year of the Tribunate of Medullinus, Vibulanus, Volusus and Ahala (or, less frequently, year 347 Ab urbe condita). The denomination 407 BC for this year has been used since the early medieval period, when the Anno Domini calendar era became the prevalent method in Europe for naming years.

== Events ==
=== By place ===
==== Greece ====
- The Athenian general Thrasybulus recaptures Abdera and Thasos.
- The Spartan admiral Lysander refuses to be lured out of Ephesus to do battle with Alcibiades. However, while Alcibiades is away seeking supplies, the Athenian squadron is placed under the command of Antiochus, his helmsman, who is routed by the Spartan fleet (with the help of the Persians under Cyrus) in the Battle of Notium (or Ephesus).
- The defeat gives the enemies of Alcibiades an excuse to strip him of his command. He never returns again to Athens. He sails north to land he owns in the Thracian Chersonese. Except for a brief appearance at Aegospotami, Alcibiades' involvement in the Peloponnesian War is over.

==== Sicily ====
- The exiled former leader of the moderate democrats of Syracuse, Hermocrates, is killed while attempting to force his way back into Syracuse.

== Births ==
- Speusippus, Greek philosopher (d. 339 BC)

== Deaths ==
- Hermocrates, leader of the moderate democrats of Syracuse
