= 390 BC =

390 BC in various calendars
- Gregorian calendar: 390 BC; CCCXC BC
- Ab urbe condita: 364
- Ancient Egypt era: XXIX dynasty, 9
- Pharaoh: Hakor, 4
- Ancient Greek Olympiad (summer): 97th Olympiad, year 3
- Assyrian calendar: 4361
- Balinese saka calendar: N/A
- Bengali calendar: −983 – −982
- Berber calendar: 561
- Buddhist calendar: 155
- Burmese calendar: −1027
- Byzantine calendar: 5119–5120
- Chinese calendar: 庚寅年 (Metal Tiger); 2308 or 2101 — to — 辛卯年 (Metal Rabbit); 2309 or 2102
- Coptic calendar: −673 – −672
- Discordian calendar: 777
- Ethiopian calendar: −397 – −396
- Hebrew calendar: 3371–3372
- Hindu calendars
- Vikram Samvat: −333 – −332
- Shaka Samvat: N/A
- Kali Yuga: 2711–2712
- Holocene calendar: 9611
- Iranian calendar: 1011 BP – 1010 BP
- Islamic calendar: 1042 BH – 1041 BH
- Javanese calendar: N/A
- Julian calendar: N/A
- Korean calendar: 1944
- Minguo calendar: 2301 before ROC 民前2301年
- Nanakshahi calendar: −1857
- Thai solar calendar: 153–154
- Tibetan calendar: ལྕགས་ཕོ་སྟག་ལོ་ (male Iron-Tiger) −263 or −644 or −1416 — to — ལྕགས་མོ་ཡོས་ལོ་ (female Iron-Hare) −262 or −643 or −1415

Year 390 BC was a year of the pre-Julian Roman calendar. At the time, it was known as the Year of the Tribunate of Ambustus, Longus, Ambustus, Fidenas, Ambustus and Cornelius (or, less frequently, year 364 Ab urbe condita). The denomination 390 BC for this year has been used since the early medieval period, when the Anno Domini calendar era became the prevalent method in Europe for naming years.

== Events ==
=== By place ===
==== Roman Republic ====
- July 18 – Battle of the Allia: Brennus, a chieftain of the Senones of the Adriatic coast of Italy, leads an army of Cisalpine Gauls in their attack on Rome. They capture the entire city of Rome except for the Capitoline Hill, which is successfully held against them. However, seeing their city devastated, the Romans attempt to buy their salvation from Brennus. The Romans agree to pay one thousand pounds weight of gold.

==== Egypt ====
- The Pharaoh of Egypt, Hakor (Akoris), concludes a tripartite alliance with Evagoras, king of Cyprus, and Athens.

=== By topic ===
==== Architecture ====
- The Temple of Asclepius is built at Epidaurus.

== Births ==
- Hypereides, Athenian orator and politician (approximate date)
- The Tollund Man (approximate date, based on his being forty years old at the time of death)

== Deaths ==
- Andocides, Athenian orator and politician (b. 440 BC)
