= Eubulus (statesman) =

4th-century BC Athenian politician and orator

Eubulus (Ancient Greek: Εὔβουλος, Euboulos; c. 405 – c. 335 BC) was a statesman of ancient Athens, who was very influential in Athenian politics during the period 355 BC to 342 BC and was notable for his abilities in managing Athenian finances.

Eubulus' early life is unknown, other than that he was from the Anaphlystus deme. With the Athenian politician, Diophantus of Sphettus, as his patron, he became chief commissioner of the important Theoric Fund, which provided free seats at public spectacles. He used this position to gradually take control of the finances of Athens and is credited with bringing a degree of prosperity not seen in many years. As an example of his approach, he introduced a law making it difficult to use public money for minor military operations, which ensured that a surplus was available for public works.

Eubulus was generally considered a member of the "peace party", in opposition to Demosthenes. During the Third Sacred War, Eubulus attempted to stop Philip of Macedon intervening in Greek affairs by forming a Common Peace, with the support of Meidias, Aeschines, and Phocion. The results of his policy included an expedition to Thermopylae in 352 BC and an intervention in Euboea in 348 BC. In 346 BC, however, during deliberations on the Peace of Philocrates, which Demosthenes and Philocrates had negotiated with Philip, he advised the Athenian people that they must accept the peace because the state of their finances meant that they could not afford to continue the war.

When Demosthenes wanted to renew the war after Philip went into Phocis, Eubulus and his supporters argued for peace. But from 344 BC on, Eubulus' influence was waning, and by 342 BC, Demosthenes' party was in control. After the Battle of Chaeronea no more is heard of Eubulus.

== Bibliography ==
- Oxford Classical Dictionary, 2nd edition (Oxford 1996): "Eubulus."
- Cawkwell, G. L. (1963). "Eubulus". The Journal of Hellenic Studies. 83: 47–67. doi:10.2307/628453. JSTOR 628453. S2CID 240093284.
- Rhodes, P. J. (1972). The Athenian Boule. Oxford: Clarendon Press.
- Burke, Edmund M. (1984). "Eubulus, Olynthus, and Euboea". Transactions of the American Philological Association. 114: 111–120. doi:10.2307/284142. JSTOR 284142.
- Davies, John K. (1971). Athenian propertied families, 600–300 B.C. Oxford: Clarendon Press. ISBN 0198142730.
- Burke, Edmund M. (2002). "The Early Political Speeches of Demosthenes: Elite Bias in the Response to Economic Crisis". Classical Antiquity. 21 (2): 165–193. doi:10.1525/ca.2002.21.2.165.
