= Ctesiphon (orator) =

4th-century BC Athenian orator

Ctesiphon (/ˈstɛsɪfɒn/; Ancient Greek: Κτησιφῶν, Ktēsiphôn) was an orator in Athens during the reign of Alexander the Great. He is best known for sparking the controversy that led to Demosthenes' speech On the Crown and Aeschines' speech Against Ctesiphon.

In 336 BC, Alexander the Great's empire was spreading, and many in Athens were opposed to the ongoing wars. Among the most outspoken was the orator Demosthenes. In 336 BC, Ctesiphon proposed that Athens honor Demosthenes for services to the city by presenting him with a golden crown. This proposal became a political issue, and in 330 BC, Aeschines prosecuted Ctesiphon on charges of legal irregularities. In his most brilliant speech, On the Crown, Demosthenes effectively defended Ctesiphon and attacked vehemently those who backed Alexander the Great's empire. As to legal irregularities, Aeschines prosecuted Ctesiphon for having violated the law in three points:

- For making false allegations in a state document.
- For unlawfully conferring a crown to a state official (Demosthenes) who had not yet rendered a report of his term of office.
- For unlawfully offering the crown at the festival called Dionysia.

Demosthenes won the legal battle with Aeschines, although Aeschines' legal objections to the crowning were probably valid.

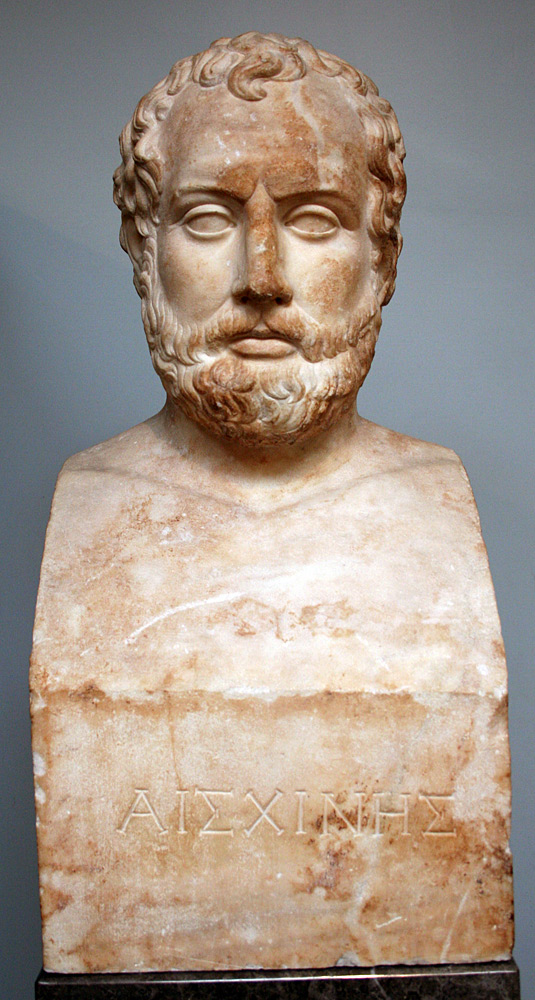
Bust of Aeschines
