= 380s BC =

Decade

This article concerns the period 389 BC – 380 BC.

== Births ==
389 BC

- Aeschines, Greek statesman and orator (d. 314 BC)

388 BC

- Aristophanes, Greek playwright (approximate year)

386 BC

- Mithridates II of Cius, ruler of Cius in Mysia from 337 to 302 BC

385 BC

- Mentor of Rhodes, Greek mercenary and satrap (approximate date)

384 BC

- Aristotle, Greek philosopher (d. 322 BC)
- Demosthenes, Greek statesman and orator (d. 322 BC)

382 BC

- Philip II, king of Macedon (d. 336 BC), son of Amyntas III of Macedon and Eurydike of Lynkestis
- Antigonus I Monophthalmus (d. 301 BC), Macedonian general under Alexander the Great and king of Macedon 306-301

380 BC

- Darius III, king of (Achaemenid) Persia (approximate date)
- Menaechmus, Greek mathematician and geometer (d. 320 BC)
- Pytheas, Greek explorer, who will explore northwestern Europe, including the British Isles (d. c. 310 BC) (approximate date)

== Deaths ==
388 BC

- Thrasybulus, Athenian general who helped overthrow the Thirty Tyrants

387 BC

- Wen, marquis of the State of Wei, China
- Rhydondis, Greek mercenary (b. c. 386 BC)

386 BC

- Aristophanes, Greek playwright (b. c. 456 BC)

385 BC

- Camissares, Persian satrap of Cilicia
- Chuzi II, Chinese ruler of the Zhou Dynasty (approximate date)

382 BC

- Orontes I of Armenia (b. 425 BC), son of Artasyrus

381 BC

- Wu Qi, Chinese military general, Prime Minister of the State of Chu, also a servant of the State of Lu (born in Wei, 440 BC)

380 BC

- Agesipolis I, king of Sparta
- Philoxenus of Cythera, Greek dithyrambic poet (b. 435 BC)
- Hakor, king of the Twenty-ninth dynasty of Egypt
- Nepherites II, son of Hakor and last king of the Twenty-ninth dynasty
