= 393 BC =

393 BC in various calendars
- Gregorian calendar: 393 BC; CCCXCIII BC
- Ab urbe condita: 361
- Ancient Egypt era: XXIX dynasty, 6
- Pharaoh: Hakor, 1
- Ancient Greek Olympiad (summer): 96th Olympiad, year 4
- Assyrian calendar: 4358
- Balinese saka calendar: N/A
- Bengali calendar: −986 – −985
- Berber calendar: 558
- Buddhist calendar: 152
- Burmese calendar: −1030
- Byzantine calendar: 5116–5117
- Chinese calendar: 丁亥年 (Fire Pig); 2305 or 2098 — to — 戊子年 (Earth Rat); 2306 or 2099
- Coptic calendar: −676 – −675
- Discordian calendar: 774
- Ethiopian calendar: −400 – −399
- Hebrew calendar: 3368–3369
- Hindu calendars
- Vikram Samvat: −336 – −335
- Shaka Samvat: N/A
- Kali Yuga: 2708–2709
- Holocene calendar: 9608
- Iranian calendar: 1014 BP – 1013 BP
- Islamic calendar: 1045 BH – 1044 BH
- Javanese calendar: N/A
- Julian calendar: N/A
- Korean calendar: 1941
- Minguo calendar: 2304 before ROC 民前2304年
- Nanakshahi calendar: −1860
- Thai solar calendar: 150–151
- Tibetan calendar: མེ་མོ་ཕག་ལོ་ (female Fire-Boar) −266 or −647 or −1419 — to — ས་ཕོ་བྱི་བ་ལོ་ (male Earth-Rat) −265 or −646 or −1418

Year 393 BC was a year of the pre-Julian Roman calendar. At the time, it was known as the Year of the Consulship of Potitus and Maluginensis (or, less frequently, year 361 Ab urbe condita). The denomination 393 BC for this year has been used since the early medieval period, when the Anno Domini calendar era became the prevalent method in Europe for naming years.

== Events ==
=== By place ===
==== Greece ====
- The Athenian general Conon and the Persian satrap Pharnabazus sail to mainland Greece, where they raid the coast of Laconia and seize the island of Cythera, where they leave a garrison and an Athenian governor.
- Pharnabazus dispatches Conon with substantial funds and a large part of the fleet to Attica, where he joins in the rebuilding of the long walls from Athens to Piraeus, a project that had been initiated by Thrasybulus in the previous year. The construction is soon completed and Athens quickly takes advantage of its walls and its fleet to seize the islands of Scyros, Imbros, and Lemnos, on which it establishes cleruchies (citizen colonies).
- Fighting breaks out in Corinth between the democratic and oligarchic parties. The democrats, supported by Argos, launch an attack on their opponents, and the oligarchs are driven from the city. These exiles go to the Spartans, based at this time at Sicyon, for support, while the Athenians and Boeotians support the democrats.
- In a night attack, the Spartans and exiles succeed in seizing Lechaeum, Corinth's port on the Gulf of Corinth, and defeat an army that comes out to challenge them the next day.

==== Macedonia ====
- Amyntas III, a great grandson of Alexander I, becomes king of Macedonia following the disorders that have plagued the country following the death of the powerful King Archelaus I in 399 BC.

==== Egypt ====
- Upon the death of King Nepherites I, two rival factions fight for the throne; one backing Muthis, son of Nepherites I, and the other supporting Psammuthes. Psammuthes is successful, but he only manages to reign as King of Egypt for part of the year.
- Hakor overthrows his predecessor, Psammuthes, as King of Egypt claiming to be the grandson of Nepherites I, founder of the 29th Dynasty.

=== By topic ===
==== Literature ====
- Aristophanes' play, a new comedy called The Ecclesiazusae, is performed.

== Deaths ==
- Nepherites I or Nefaarud I, Pharaoh of Egypt
- Emperor Kōshō of Japan, according to legend.
