= 380 BC =

380 BC in various calendars
- Gregorian calendar: 380 BC; CCCLXXX BC
- Ab urbe condita: 374
- Ancient Egypt era: XXX dynasty, 1
- Pharaoh: Nectanebo I, 1
- Ancient Greek Olympiad (summer): 100th Olympiad (victor)¹
- Assyrian calendar: 4371
- Balinese saka calendar: N/A
- Bengali calendar: −973 – −972
- Berber calendar: 571
- Buddhist calendar: 165
- Burmese calendar: −1017
- Byzantine calendar: 5129–5130
- Chinese calendar: 庚子年 (Metal Rat); 2318 or 2111 — to — 辛丑年 (Metal Ox); 2319 or 2112
- Coptic calendar: −663 – −662
- Discordian calendar: 787
- Ethiopian calendar: −387 – −386
- Hebrew calendar: 3381–3382
- Hindu calendars
- Vikram Samvat: −323 – −322
- Shaka Samvat: N/A
- Kali Yuga: 2721–2722
- Holocene calendar: 9621
- Iranian calendar: 1001 BP – 1000 BP
- Islamic calendar: 1032 BH – 1031 BH
- Javanese calendar: N/A
- Julian calendar: N/A
- Korean calendar: 1954
- Minguo calendar: 2291 before ROC 民前2291年
- Nanakshahi calendar: −1847
- Thai solar calendar: 163–164
- Tibetan calendar: ལྕགས་ཕོ་བྱི་བ་ལོ་ (male Iron-Rat) −253 or −634 or −1406 — to — ལྕགས་མོ་གླང་ལོ་ (female Iron-Ox) −252 or −633 or −1405

Year 380 BC was a year of the pre-Julian Roman calendar. At the time, it was known as the Year of the Tribunate of Poplicola, Poplicola, Maluginensis, Lanatus, Peticus, Mamercinus, Fidenas, Crassus and Mugillanus (or, less frequently, year 374 Ab urbe condita). The denomination 380 BC for this year has been used since the early medieval period, when the Anno Domini calendar era became the prevalent method in Europe for naming years.

== Events ==
=== By place ===
==== Persian empire ====
- Persia forces the Athenians to withdraw their general Chabrias from Egypt. Chabrias has been successfully supporting the Egyptian Pharaohs in maintaining their independence from the Persian Empire.

==== Egypt ====
- The Egyptian Pharaoh Hakor dies and is succeeded by his son Nepherites II, but the latter is overthrown by Nectanebo I within the year, ending the Twenty-ninth dynasty of Egypt. Nectanabo (or more properly Nekhtnebef) becomes the first Pharaoh of the Thirtieth Dynasty of Egypt.

==== Greece ====
- Cleombrotus I succeeds his brother Agesipolis I as king of Sparta.

=== By topic ===
==== Art ====
- What some historians call the Rich style in Greece comes to an end.

== Births ==
- Darius III, king of (Achaemenid) Persia (approximate date)
- Menaechmus, Greek mathematician and geometer (d. 320 BC)
- Pytheas, Greek explorer, who will explore northwestern Europe, including the British Isles (d. c. 310 BC) (approximate date)
- Nectanbo II last Native ruler of Ancient Egypt (approximate date)

== Deaths ==
- Agesipolis I, king of Sparta
- Philoxenus of Cythera, Greek dithyrambic poet (b. 435 BC)
- Hakor, king of the Twenty-ninth dynasty of Egypt
- Nepherites II, son of Hakor and last king of the Twenty-ninth dynasty
