= Muthis =

Possible Egyptian Twenty-ninth Dynasty pharaoh

Pharaoh
- Reign: possibly a year between 393 and 380 BCE
- Predecessor: uncertain
- Successor: uncertain
- Dynasty: 29th Dynasty

Muthis may have been an ephemeral ancient Egyptian pharaoh of the Twenty-ninth Dynasty.

== Biography ==
He is sometime reported as a son of Nepherites I who ruled for a brief time before being deposed by an usurper, Psammuthes. However, this statement is based on an interpretation of a passage in the Demotic Chronicle:

His son (i.e. of Nepherites I) was allowed to succeed him. (But) a short time was vouchsafed to him...

Nevertheless, the Demotic Chronicle never mentions the name of Muthis and, as pointed out by the Egyptologist John D. Ray, "his son" could be a reference to Hakor instead.

It is also possible that Muthis was a very shadowly usurper, maybe related to the other usurper Psammuthes. Another option is that "Muthis" was simply a copying error, and therefore never existed; the latter hypothesis is supported by the fact that the name is clearly hellenized but there are no clues of what could have originally meant "Muthis" in Egyptian.

== Attestations ==
His name does not appear on any monument, and he is only mentioned by Eusebius's Epithome of Manetho. Eusebius gave him a single year of reign and placed him at the very end of the dynasty, after Nepherites II; however, the Armenian version of Eusebius placed him between Psammuthes and Nepherites II.

== Bibliography ==
Ray, J.D., 1986: "Psammuthis and Hakoris", The Journal of Egyptian Archaeology, 72: 149–158.
