= 399 BC =

399 BC in various calendars
Gregorian calendar	399 BC; CCCXCIX BC
Ab urbe condita	355
Ancient Egypt era	XXVIII dynasty, 6
Pharaoh	Amyrtaeus, 6
Ancient Greek Olympiad (summer)	95th Olympiad, year 2
Assyrian calendar	4352
Balinese saka calendar	N/A
Bengali calendar	−992 – −991
Berber calendar	552
Buddhist calendar	146
Burmese calendar	−1036
Byzantine calendar	5110–5111
Chinese calendar	辛巳年 (Metal Snake); 2299 or 2092 — to — 壬午年 (Water Horse); 2300 or 2093
Coptic calendar	−682 – −681
Discordian calendar	768
Ethiopian calendar	−406 – −405
Hebrew calendar	3362–3363
- Hindu calendars
Vikram Samvat	−342 – −341
Shaka Samvat	N/A
Kali Yuga	2702–2703
Holocene calendar	9602
Iranian calendar	1020 BP – 1019 BP
Islamic calendar	1051 BH – 1050 BH
Javanese calendar	N/A
Julian calendar	N/A
Korean calendar	1935
Minguo calendar	2310 before ROC 民前2310年
Nanakshahi calendar	−1866
Thai solar calendar	144–145
Tibetan calendar	阴金蛇年 (female Iron-Snake) −272 or −653 or −1425 — to — 阳水马年 (male Water-Horse) −271 or −652 or −1424

Year 399 BC was a year of the pre-Julian Roman calendar. At the time, it was known as the Year of the Tribunate of Augurinus, Longus, Priscus, Cicurinus, Rufus and Philo (or, less frequently, year 355 Ab urbe condita). The denomination 399 BC for this year has been used since the early medieval period, when the Anno Domini calendar era became the prevalent method in Europe for naming years.

== Events ==
=== By place ===
==== Greece ====
- February 15 – The Greek philosopher Socrates is sentenced to death by Athenian authorities, condemned for impiety and the corruption of youth. He refuses to flee into exile and dies by drinking hemlock.
- Sparta forces Elis to surrender in the spring.
- The Spartan admiral, Lysander, tries to effect a political revolution in Sparta by suggesting that the king should not automatically be given the leadership of the army. He also suggests that the position of king should be elective. However, he is unsuccessful in achieving these reforms, and earns the disfavour of King Agesilaus II of Sparta.
- King Archelaus I of Macedon is killed during a hunt, by one of the royal pages, his lover Craterus.

==== Egypt ====
- King Amyrtaeus of Egypt is defeated in battle by his successor, Nepherites I of Mendes, and executed at Memphis. King Nepherites I, or Nefaarud I, founds the Twenty-ninth dynasty of Egypt. He makes Mendes his capital.

== Deaths ==
- King Amyrtaeus of Egypt
- King Archelaus I of Macedon
- Socrates, Greek philosopher (b. c. 470 BC)
