= Nepherites =

Two pharaohs of Ancient Egypt's 29th dynasty shared the name Nepherites:

- Nepherites I (ruled 399–393 BC)
- Nepherites II (ruled 380 BC)
