= 506 (disambiguation) =

506 was a common year starting on Sunday of the Julian calendar.

506 may also refer to:

- 506 (number)
- 506 (film)
  - 506 II, the second film of franchise
  - 506 III, the third film of franchise
- 506 Carlton, streetcar (tram) line run by the Toronto Transit Commission in Toronto, Canada
- Area code 506, telephone area code in the Canadian province of New Brunswick

== See also ==
- 506th (disambiguation)
