= Psammuthes =

Egyptian pharaoh (ruled 392/1 BC)

- Psammuthis, Pasherienmut
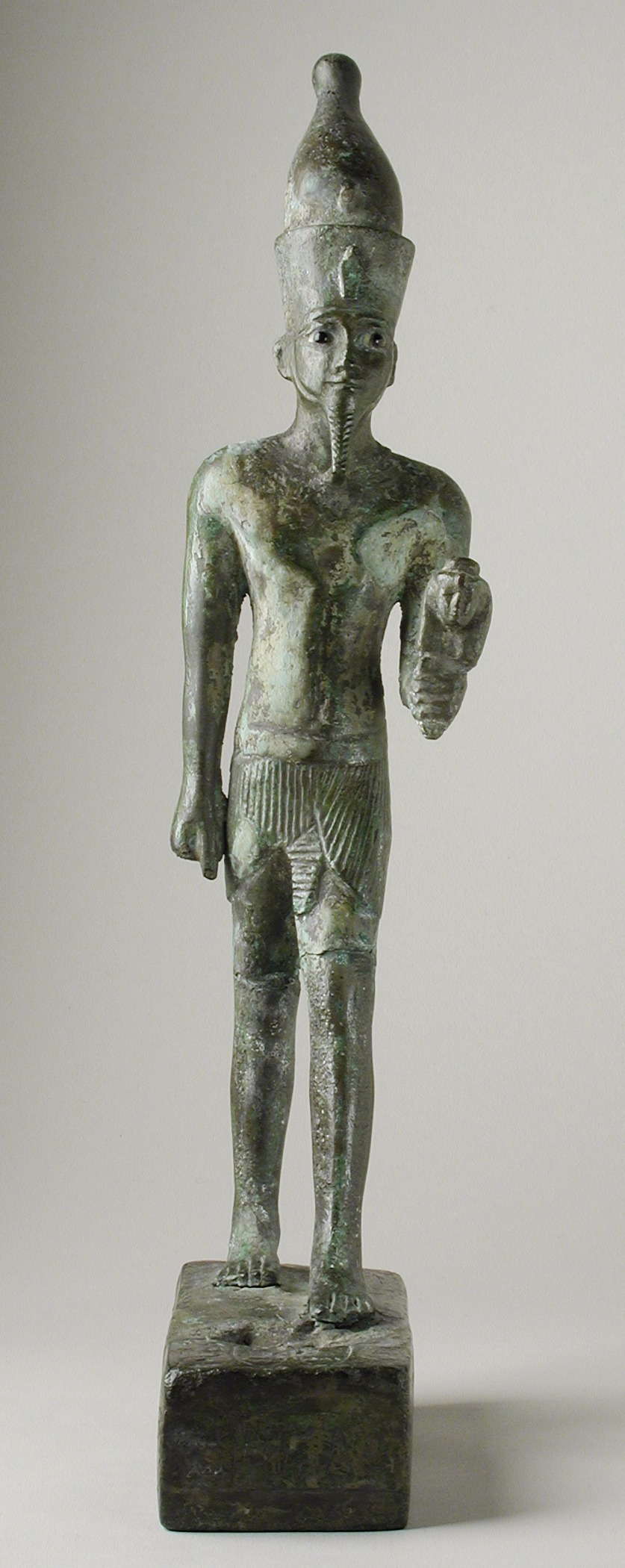
- Bronze statue of Psammuthes, LACMA.

Pharaoh
- Reign: 392/1 BC
- Predecessor: Hakor
- Successor: Hakor (restored)
Royal titulary
Horus name
Aaphety marsepu
ˁ3-pḥtj-mˁr-sp.w''
G5	O29 F9 F9 V38 O50 Z2
Prenomen
Userre setepenptah
Wsr-Rˁ-stp-n-Pth
Powerful is Ra, chosen by Ptah

M23 X1 L2 X1	N5 wsr s p t V28 stp n
Nomen
Pasherienmut
P3-šrj-(n)-Mwt
Child of Mut

G39 N5	p A17 t G15
- Dynasty: 29th Dynasty

Psammuthes or Psammuthis, was a pharaoh of the Twenty-ninth Dynasty of Egypt during 392/1 BC.

== Biography ==
The place of this king in the dynasty is a matter of debate. Although he is mentioned in three different epitomes of Manetho's Aegyptiaca (Africanus, Eusebius and the Armenian version of the latter) and in the Demotic Chronicle, the sequence of kings is different among these sources and it is unclear if Psammuthes succeeded Hakor, or vice versa.

According to a hypothesis of the Egyptologist John D. Ray, upon the death of Nepherites I in 393 BC, the throne passed to his son and successor, which is likely to have been Hakor. However, it seems that in his Year 2 a usurper, Psammuthes (a hellenized form of the Egyptian name Pasherienmut), seized power and deposed Hakor, while proclaiming himself pharaoh.

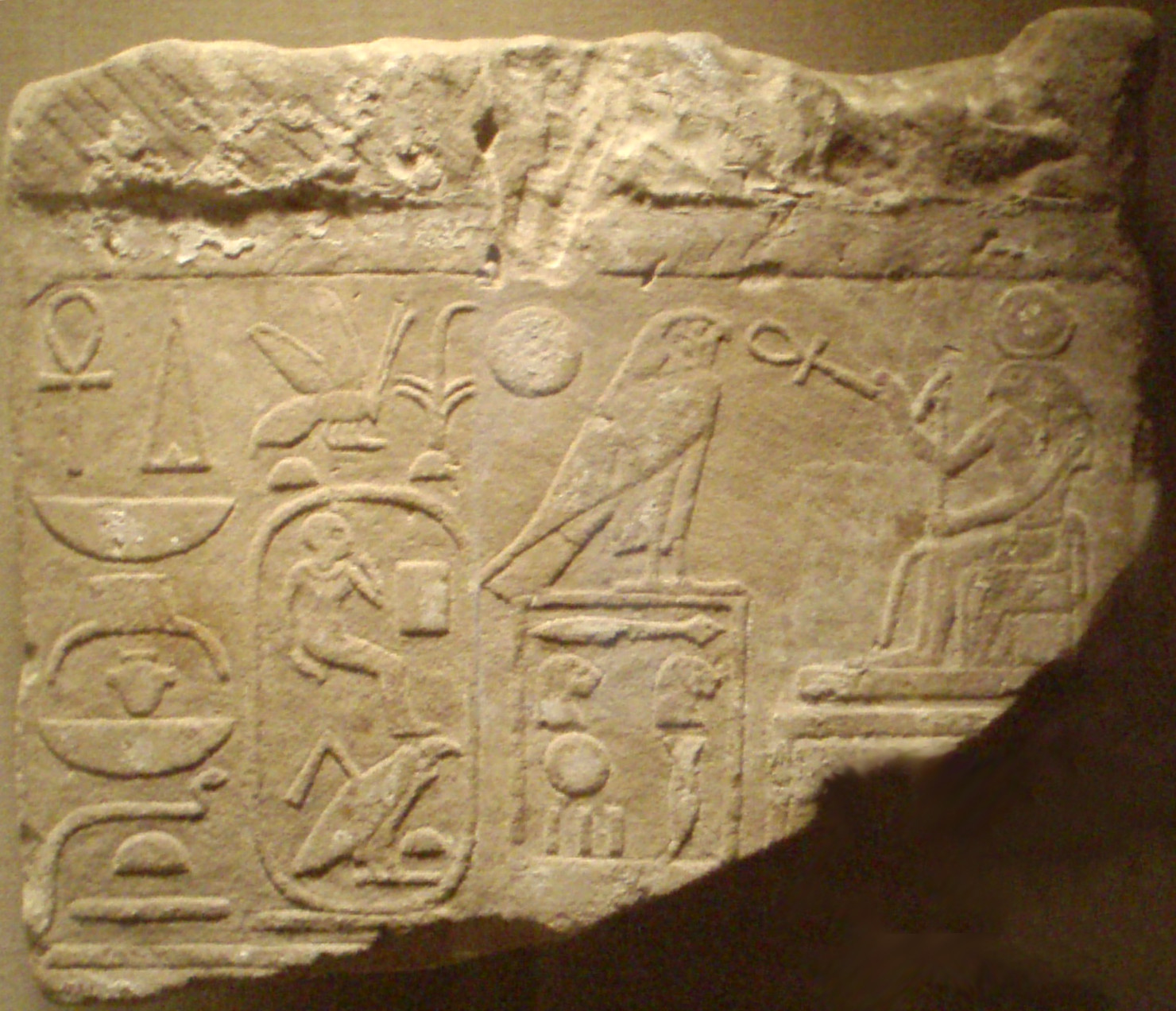
Relief bearing part of Psammuthes' royal titulary, Metropolitan Museum of Art.

Both Manetho and the Demotic Chronicle give to Psammuthes a reign length of a year, agreeing with the highest date given by archaeological records, a Mother of Apis stele recording his "Year 1, fourth month of Peret". Before the year 2 of Psammuthes, and thus before the "official" year 3 of Hakor, the latter in some way resumed power, and then continued to date his monuments since his first coronation date, simply pretending that the usurper never existed.

Nevertheless, some archaeological records mentioning Psammuthes have survived: the Mother of Apis stele from the Serapeum of Saqqara, a block from Akhmim, and some other findings all from the Theban region. Psammuthes is generally credited to have ordered the construction of a chapel in Karnak, which was later usurped and finished by Hakor. It is also possible, however, that the chapel was started by Hakor before his deposition and further restored by him during his second reign.

== Archaeological Evidence ==
In 2022 and 2023, excavations at Tell Timai conducted by a joint mission of Nottingham Trent University and the University of Hawaii under the directorship of Jay Silverstein and Robert Littman uncovered the remains of a 29th Dynasty temple with a monumental inscription dedicated to Psammuthes. At this time, Thmuis (Tell Timai) was merely an extension of Mendes, then the political capital of Egypt. Like the 29th dynasty tombs and temples at Mendes, this temple appears to have been looted and raised after Artaxerxes III recoquered Egypt. The temple was rebuilt during the reign of Ptolemy II with at least a portion of the new temple dedicated to Arsinoe II in her Isis aspect. This second temple appears to have been destroyed during the Great Rebellion referenced on the Rosetta Stone.

== See also ==
- Muthis, a presumed claimant to the throne during his reign

Preceded by Hakor	Pharaoh of Egypt; Twenty-Ninth Dynasty	Succeeded by Hakor (restored)
