= 506th =

506th may refer to:

- 506th Air Expeditionary Group, provisional United States Air Force unit
- 506th Air Refueling Squadron, inactive United States Air Force unit
- 506th Airborne Infantry Regiment Association, charitable veterans' organization
- 506th Bombardment Squadron, inactive United States Air Force unit
- 506th Fighter Squadron, unit of the Oklahoma Air National Guard that flies the KC-135 Stratotanker
- 506th Infantry Regiment (United States), an airborne forces regiment of the US Army

== See also ==
- 506 (number)
- 506, the year 506 (DVI) of the Julian calendar
- 506 BC
- E Company, 506th Infantry Regiment (United States), one of the best-known companies in the United States Army
