= 310 BC =

310 BC in various calendars
- Gregorian calendar: 310 BC; CCCX BC
- Ab urbe condita: 444
- Ancient Egypt era: XXXIII dynasty, 14
- Pharaoh: Ptolemy I Soter, 14
- Ancient Greek Olympiad (summer): 117th Olympiad, year 3
- Assyrian calendar: 4441
- Balinese saka calendar: N/A
- Bengali calendar: −903 – −902
- Berber calendar: 641
- Buddhist calendar: 235
- Burmese calendar: −947
- Byzantine calendar: 5199–5200
- Chinese calendar: 庚戌年 (Metal Dog); 2388 or 2181 — to — 辛亥年 (Metal Pig); 2389 or 2182
- Coptic calendar: −593 – −592
- Discordian calendar: 857
- Ethiopian calendar: −317 – −316
- Hebrew calendar: 3451–3452
- Hindu calendars
- Vikram Samvat: −253 – −252
- Shaka Samvat: N/A
- Kali Yuga: 2791–2792
- Holocene calendar: 9691
- Iranian calendar: 931 BP – 930 BP
- Islamic calendar: 960 BH – 959 BH
- Javanese calendar: N/A
- Julian calendar: N/A
- Korean calendar: 2024
- Minguo calendar: 2221 before ROC 民前2221年
- Nanakshahi calendar: −1777
- Seleucid era: 2/3 AG
- Thai solar calendar: 233–234
- Tibetan calendar: ལྕགས་ཕོ་ཁྱི་ལོ་ (male Iron-Dog) −183 or −564 or −1336 — to — ལྕགས་མོ་ཕག་ལོ་ (female Iron-Boar) −182 or −563 or −1335

Year 310 BC was a year of the pre-Julian Roman calendar. At the time, it was known as the Year of the Consulship of Rullianus and Censorinus (or, less frequently, year 444 Ab urbe condita). The denomination 310 BC for this year has been used since the early medieval period, when the Anno Domini calendar era became the prevalent method in Europe for naming years.

== Events ==
=== By place ===
==== Greece/Macedonia ====
- Antigonid general Ptolemy forms an alliance with Cassander revolting against his uncle Antigonus

==== Cyprus ====
- By order of Ptolemy, Nicocles of Paphos kills himself.

==== Babylonia ====
- Antigonus orders Nicanor, one of his generals, to invade Babylonia from the east and his son Demetrius Poliorcetes to attack it from the west. Nicanor assembles a large force but is surprised and defeated by Seleucus at the river Tigris, and his troops are either cut to pieces or defect to the enemy. Similarly, Demetrius Poliorcetes fails to oust Seleucus.

==== Asia Minor ====
- Ptolemy attacks Cilicia, territory held by Antigonus, but is driven out by Demetrius.
- The cities of Antigonia Troas (later known as Alexandria Troas) and Antigoneia (later known as Nicaea) are founded by Antigonus I Monophthalmus.

==== Sicily and Africa ====
- The tyrant of Syracuse, Agathocles, escapes from the siege of the city by the Carthaginians with a fleet and carries the war with the Carthaginians back into his enemy's territory. He defeats the Carthaginians in the Battle of White Tunis.

==== Roman Republic ====
- Rome deals with renewed trouble from the Etruscans, who are persuaded by the Samnites to cease their alliance with the Romans. In the Battle of Lake Vadimo, the Romans under Fabius Maximus Rullianus defeat the Etruscans.

==== Illyria ====
- The Autariatae disappear due to Celtic migrations.

== Births ==
- Aristarchus of Samos, Greek astronomer and mathematician (approximate date) (d. c. 230 BC)
- Huiwen of Zhao, Chinese king of Zhao (Warring States Period) (d. 266 BC)
- Xun Zi, Chinese philosopher (approximate date) (d. c. 230 BC)

== Deaths ==
- Roxana, Bactrian or Sogdian princess, widow of Alexander the Great
- Pytheas, Greek merchant, geographer and explorer from the Greek colony Massilia (today Marseille) (b. c. 380 BC)
- Nicocles (Paphos) king of Paphos
