= Battle of White Tunis =

Battle in Sicilian Wars

- Part of The Seventh Sicilian War
Date	310 BC
Location	White Tunis, possibly near modern Tunis, Tunisia
Result	Greek victory

Belligerents
Carthage	Syracuse

Commanders and leaders
Hanno †; Bomilcar	Agathocles of Syracuse; Archagathus

Strength
40,000 infantry 1,000 cavalry 2,000 chariots	Above 13,500 infantry

Casualties and losses
Diodorus: 1,000; Justin: 3,000; Modern estimate: 3,000	Diodorus: 200; Justin: 2,000; Modern estimate: 500

The Battle of White Tunis was fought between Carthage and the tyrant Agathocles of Syracuse in 310 BC. It was the first large battle of the Agathocles' military expedition to Libya. Even though heavily outnumbered by the Carthaginian army, the soldiers of Agathocles were far more experienced in warfare than the Carthaginian citizen soldiers. Another important factor was the terrain, which prevented the Carthaginians from using their numbers to outflank Agathocles. The Carthaginian suffered a serious defeat, which caused some of the Carthaginian allies to change their allegiance to Agathocles.

== Prelude ==
Earlier during his war against Carthage, Agathocles had lost the Battle of the Himera River in 311 BC and lost control of Sicily except for Syracuse itself, which was besieged by the Carthaginians in the same year. Instead of facing the army which besieged Syracuse, he decided to start an unexpected and risky attack on his enemy's home soil, Libya. It would divert the Carthaginians from Syracuse and incite the Libyan allies of Carthage to revolt, as well as allowing him to plunder the wealthy territory of Carthage. He calculated that his experienced army, even though little remained of it, would have an edge over the Carthaginian forces there, which were not as experienced as the Carthaginian forces in Sicily.

With sixty triremes Agathocles managed to escape a Carthaginian blockade of Syracuse in August 310 BC. His fleet narrowly escaped a naval battle with a pursuing Carthaginian fleet as they landed at Latomiae, which is near the modern Cape Bon. Agathocles then burned his ships to remove any option of retreat for his soldiers. Additionally, he no longer needed to leave a part of his force to guard the ships and precluded their capture by the Carthaginians.

After the Greek army looted the prosperous countryside, Agathocles led his army in a direct assault against the Carthaginian city of Megalopolis. Even though the city had walls, the inhabitants were not expecting an attack on their city and they were not experienced in warfare. After a short period of resistance, the Greeks looted and destroyed the city. Agathocles then attacked and razed the city of White Tunis and set up camp outside the city. (It has been suggested that Megalopolis can be identified with the site of modern Soliman and White Tunis with modern Tunis, but this is not certain.)

Panic ensued in Carthage when the inhabitants learned of the arrival of Agathocles in Libya. They thought that Agathocles would not have left Syracuse unless the Carthaginian army and navy there had been eliminated. Their panic subsided when Carthaginian messengers from Sicily reported that Agathocles had escaped the blockade and that Carthaginian forces in Sicily were still intact. The council of elders appointed two Carthaginian rivals, Hanno and Bomilcar, as the generals of an army to defeat Agathocles. According to Diodorus Siculus, Bomilcar wanted to exploit this event to get rid of his rival and seize power in Carthage for himself.

== Battle ==
According to Diodorus Siculus, Hanno and Bomilcar wanted to attack Agathocles quickly. So they did not wait for soldiers from the countryside or their allied cities to arrive. They raised an army of 40,000 infantry, 1,000 cavalry and 2,000 chariots from the Carthaginian citizenry. The numbers for the chariots given by Diodorus were probably much exaggerated. Justin writes that the Carthaginian army numbered 30,000 men and mentions only Hanno as the general. The Carthaginians approached Agathocles at his camp near White Tunis and assumed battle formations. Hanno commanded the right flank with the Sacred Band beside him. Bomilcar was on the left flank with a deep phalanx, because the terrain prevented him from extending his formation. They placed the chariots and cavalry in front, who were to strike the Greeks first.

Agathocles placed his son Archagathus on the right wing with 2,500 infantry. He also deployed 3,500 Syracusans, 3,000 Greeks, 3,000 Samnites, Etruscans and Celts. He commanded the front of the left wing himself with his guards and 1,000 hoplites to fight the Sacred Band. He divided 500 archers and slingers between the wings. To boost the morale of his soldiers he released owls, which were sacred to Athena, into his ranks.

The Carthaginian chariots and then the cavalry charged the Greeks first, but their assault proved to be ineffective. They suffered casualties and fled to the rear of the Carthaginian army. Then the Carthaginian infantry engaged. Hanno and the Sacred Band attacked fiercely, causing many casualties on the Greek side. However, Hanno was seriously wounded and died during the battle. The Carthaginians near him were shocked, which encouraged the Greeks to press them harder. When Bomilcar became aware of this situation, he made an orderly withdrawal to the high ground. Diodorus Siculus attributes this to his desire to see the Carthaginian citizens defeated, which would enable him to seize power in Carthage. This ordered withdrawal turned into a rout. The Sacred Band continued to offer resistance, but fled when they were about to be surrounded. Agathocles pursued them towards Carthage for some time, but then turned back and plundered the enemy camp.

Diodorus Siculus counts 200 Greek casualties and 1,000 for the Carthaginians, adding that others give a number up to 6,000 killed Carthaginians. Justin gives 2,000 Greek and 3,000 Carthaginian dead. A modern estimate is that the Greeks lost 500 men and the Carthaginians 3,000.

== Aftermath ==
With his small force Agathocles was not able to besiege Carthage, so he encamped before the city and pillaged the countryside. In Carthage the inhabitants thought they were suffering from the anger of the gods, who now needed to be satisfied. They sent a large sum of money and other expensive offerings to their mother city Tyre as a sacrifice to Melqart. To Baal they sacrificed two hundred children and three hundred adults by throwing them into a pit with fire. This mass sacrifice is attested to by Diodorus, a strong Syracusan patriot, and therefore its accuracy may be questionable.

Several cities around Carthage went over to Agathocles, either out of fear of him or hatred for Carthage. After fortifying his camp at White Tunis and leaving an adequate garrison there, he subjugated the cities along the coast. He stormed Neapolis but did not sack it. After Agathocles laid siege to Hadrumetum for a short time, Aelymas, the king of the Libyans, made an alliance with him. The Carthaginians used Agathocles' absence to attack White Tunis, capturing his camp and besieging the city. When Agathocles heard of this, he left the siege of Hadrumetum with a small force to travel to a mountain which was visible from both White Tunis and Hadrumetum. He set up a ruse for both his enemies by making his soldiers light a large number of fires at night. The Carthaginians abandoned the siege and retreated because they thought Agathocles was approaching with a large army. Hadrumetum surrendered to him because they thought Agathocles was about to receive a large number of reinforcements. He then took Thapsus by storm and continued to expand his power over more cities both by force and with persuasion. After he had gained control of all the cities and towns in the vicinity of Carthage, which numbered over two hundred, he planned to lead his army further into the interior of Libya.

Agathocles had to deal with one minor battle at White Tunis. The Carthaginians received 5,000 men from Sicily who were diverted from the Siege of Syracuse. A few days after Agathocles had departed for Libya's inland regions, the Carthaginians again laid siege to White Tunis with their reinforcements. They were joined by some of their Libyan allies, including king Aelymas, who had betrayed his alliance with Agathocles. When this news reached Agathocles he turned back, marched at night and made a surprise attack on the Carthaginian besiegers at dawn. He killed 2,000 of their forces as well as king Aelymas and took some captives. He then resumed his plans to campaign in Libya, but he would face another battle at White Tunis in 309 BC.
