= 470 BC =

470 BC in various calendars
- Gregorian calendar: 470 BC; CDLXX BC
- Ab urbe condita: 284
- Ancient Egypt era: XXVII dynasty, 56
- Pharaoh: Xerxes I of Persia, 16
- Ancient Greek Olympiad (summer): 77th Olympiad, year 3
- Assyrian calendar: 4281
- Balinese saka calendar: N/A
- Bengali calendar: −1063 – −1062
- Berber calendar: 481
- Buddhist calendar: 75
- Burmese calendar: −1107
- Byzantine calendar: 5039–5040
- Chinese calendar: 庚午年 (Metal Horse); 2228 or 2021 — to — 辛未年 (Metal Goat); 2229 or 2022
- Coptic calendar: −753 – −752
- Discordian calendar: 697
- Ethiopian calendar: −477 – −476
- Hebrew calendar: 3291–3292
- Hindu calendars
- Vikram Samvat: −413 – −412
- Shaka Samvat: N/A
- Kali Yuga: 2631–2632
- Holocene calendar: 9531
- Iranian calendar: 1091 BP – 1090 BP
- Islamic calendar: 1125 BH – 1123 BH
- Javanese calendar: N/A
- Julian calendar: N/A
- Korean calendar: 1864
- Minguo calendar: 2381 before ROC 民前2381年
- Nanakshahi calendar: −1937
- Thai solar calendar: 73–74
- Tibetan calendar: ལྕགས་ཕོ་རྟ་ལོ་ (male Iron-Horse) −343 or −724 or −1496 — to — ལྕགས་མོ་ལུག་ལོ་ (female Iron-Sheep) −342 or −723 or −1495

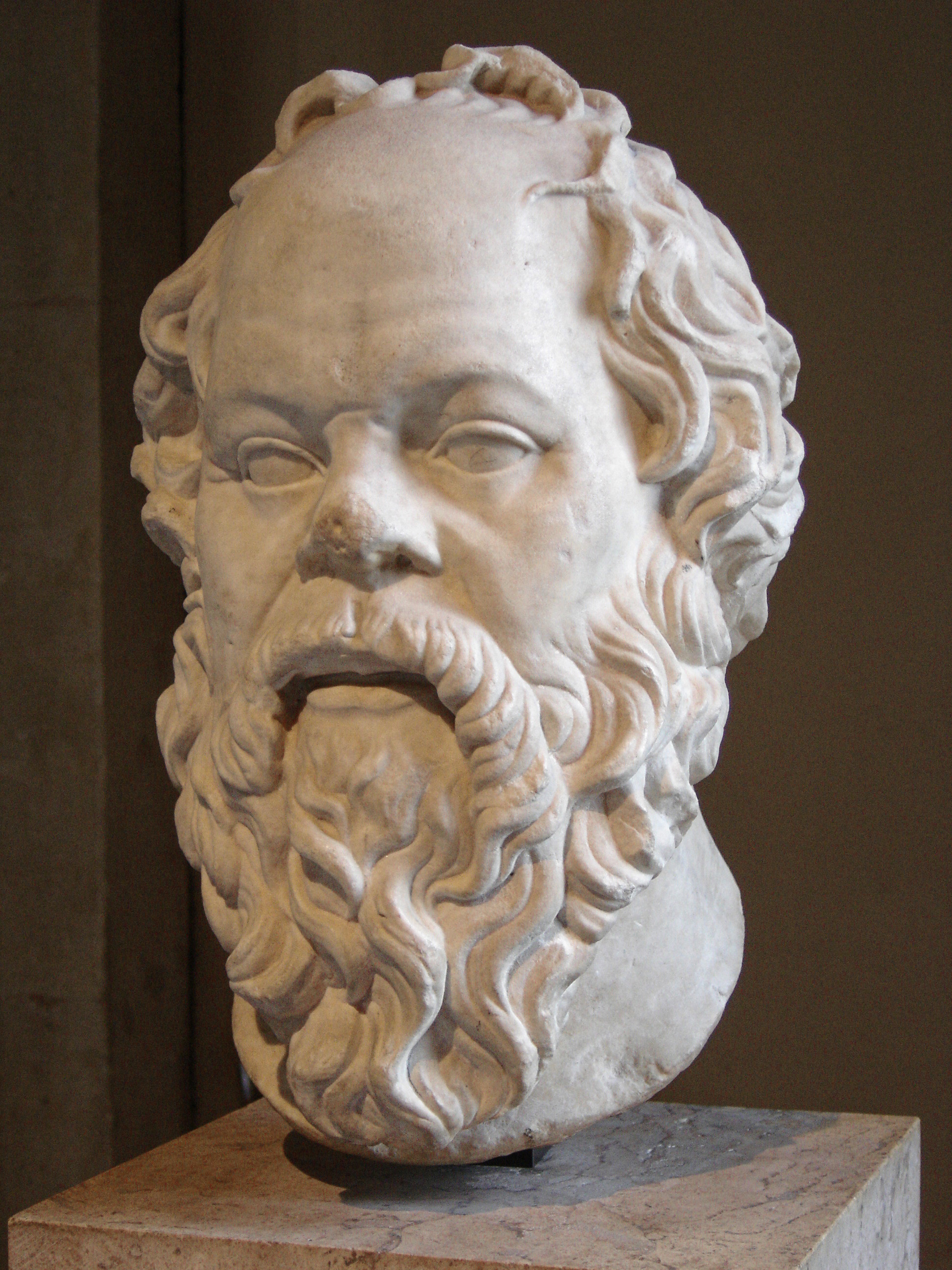
A bust of Socrates (c. 470–399 BC)

Year 470 BC was a year of the pre-Julian Roman calendar. At the time, it was known as the Year of the Consulship of Potitus and Mamercus (or, less frequently, year 284 Ab urbe condita). The denomination 470 BC for this year has been used since the early medieval period, when the Anno Domini calendar era became the prevalent method in Europe for naming years.

== Events ==
=== By place ===
==== Greece ====
- Suspected of plotting to seize power in Sparta by instigating a helot uprising, Pausanias takes refuge in the Temple of Athena of the Brazen House to escape arrest. The sanctuary is respected, but the Spartans wall in the sanctuary and starve Pausanias to death.

=== By topic ===
==== Architecture ====
- The construction of the Temple of Zeus, begins at Olympia, Greece. This includes the relief sculpture (of which fragments now remain at the Archaeological Museum of Olympia) of Apollo with battling Lapiths and centaurs (approximate date).

==== Art ====
- The Charioteer, in the Sanctuary of Apollo, Delphi, is created in commemoration of a victory in the Pythian Games of 478 or 474 BC (approximate date). It is now preserved at the Delphi Archaeological Museum.
- Pan Painter makes a "bell krater" (an earthenware piece that is used to mix water and wine) which has a red-figure decoration of Artemis slaying Actaeon. It is now preserved at the Museum of Fine Arts in Boston (approximate date).

== Births ==
- Aspasia of Miletus, mistress of Pericles of Athens (d. c. 400 BC)
- Hippocrates of Chios, Greek mathematician (d. c. 410 BC)
- Mozi (or Mo Tzu), Chinese philosopher (d. c. 391)
- Socrates, Greek philosopher (d. c. 399 BC)

== Deaths ==
- Pausanias, Spartan commander during the Greco-Persian Wars
