= 506 BC =

506 BC in various calendars
- Gregorian calendar: 506 BC; DVI BC
- Ab urbe condita: 248
- Ancient Egypt era: XXVII dynasty, 20
- Pharaoh: Darius I of Persia, 16
- Ancient Greek Olympiad (summer): 68th Olympiad, year 3
- Assyrian calendar: 4245
- Balinese saka calendar: N/A
- Bengali calendar: −1099 – −1098
- Berber calendar: 445
- Buddhist calendar: 39
- Burmese calendar: −1143
- Byzantine calendar: 5003–5004
- Chinese calendar: 甲午年 (Wood Horse); 2192 or 1985 — to — 乙未年 (Wood Goat); 2193 or 1986
- Coptic calendar: −789 – −788
- Discordian calendar: 661
- Ethiopian calendar: −513 – −512
- Hebrew calendar: 3255–3256
- Hindu calendars
- Vikram Samvat: −449 – −448
- Shaka Samvat: N/A
- Kali Yuga: 2595–2596
- Holocene calendar: 9495
- Iranian calendar: 1127 BP – 1126 BP
- Islamic calendar: 1162 BH – 1161 BH
- Javanese calendar: N/A
- Julian calendar: N/A
- Korean calendar: 1828
- Minguo calendar: 2417 before ROC 民前2417年
- Nanakshahi calendar: −1973
- Thai solar calendar: 37–38
- Tibetan calendar: ཤིང་ཕོ་རྟ་ལོ་ (male Wood-Horse) −379 or −760 or −1532 — to — ཤིང་མོ་ལུག་ལོ་ (female Wood-Sheep) −378 or −759 or −1531

The year 506 BC was a year of the pre-Julian Roman calendar. In the Roman Empire it was known as the Year of the Consulship of Rufus and Aquilinus (or, less frequently, year 248 Ab urbe condita). The denomination 506 BC for this year has been used since the early medieval period, when the Anno Domini calendar era became the prevalent method in Europe for naming years.

== Events ==
=== By place ===
==== China ====
- Battle of Boju (Chinese: 柏舉之戰)—During the Spring and Autumn period of ancient China, forces of the state of Wu under Sun Tzu decisively defeat forces of the state of Chu, destroying the Chu capital of Ying and forcing King Zhao to flee.

== Births ==
- Kōshō, emperor of Japan (d. 393 BC)
- Yan Yan, a disciple of Confucius

== Deaths ==
- Shen Yin Shu, general of the State of Chu
