= Amyrtaeus =

Egyptian pharaoh from 404 to 399 BC

- Amenirdisu; Amyrtaios of Sais (Ἀμυρταῖος Σαΐτης in Greek)
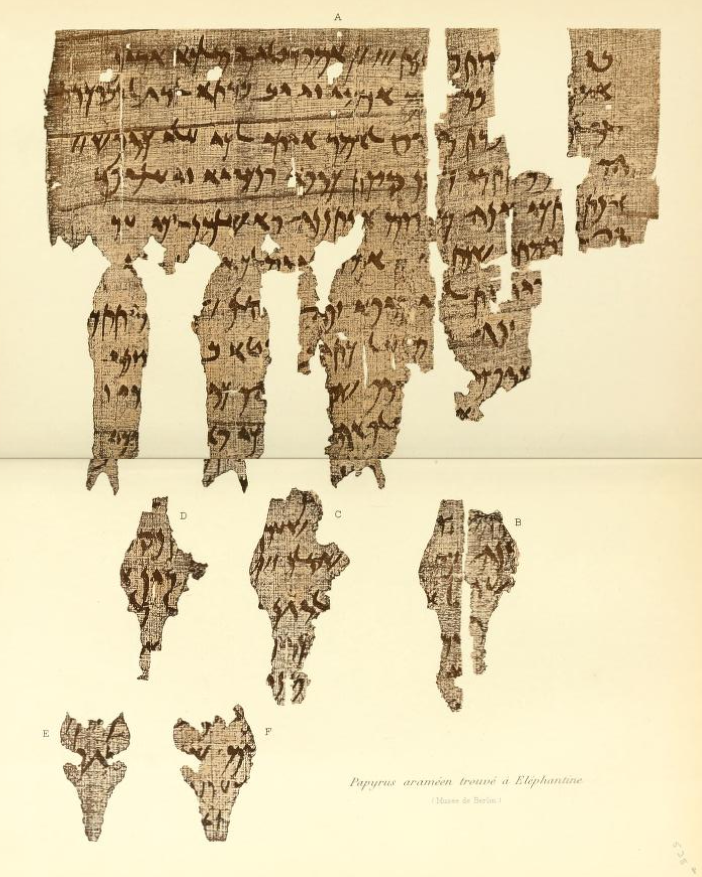
- Aramaic papyrus from Elephantine, dating to Regnal Year 5 of Amyrtaeus (400 BC).

Pharaoh
- Reign: 5 years, 404 BC to October 399 BC
- Predecessor: Darius II
- Successor: Nepherites I
Royal titulary
Nomen
Amenirdisu
jmn-jr-dj-s
Amun causes him to be given
Demotic:
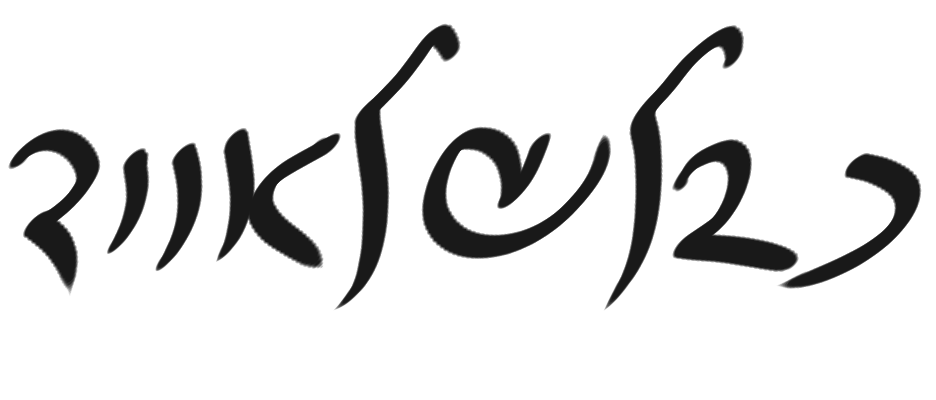
hieroglyphs (reconstitution):

G39 N5	i mn n i A2 ir D37 z
- Died: October 399 BC
- Dynasty: 28th Dynasty

Amyrtaeus of Sais (Greek: Ἀμυρταῖος Amyrtaios, a Hellenization of the original Egyptian name Amenirdisu) is the only pharaoh of the Twenty-eighth Dynasty of Egypt and is thought to be related to the royal family of the Twenty-sixth Dynasty (664–525 BC). He ended the first Persian occupation of Egypt (i.e. the Twenty-seventh Dynasty: 525–404 BC) and reigned from 404 BC to 399 BC. Amyrtaeus' successful insurrection inaugurated Egypt's last significant phase of independence under native sovereigns, which lasted for about 60 years until the Persians conquered the country again.

== Biography ==
=== Sources and identity ===
Sextus Julius Africanus (Chronographiai) calls him "Amyrteos", while Eusebius of Caesarea (Chronicon) calls him "Amirtaios" — both of them recording that he reigned for 6 years. An ancient Egyptian prophetic text, the Demotic Chronicle (3rd/2nd century BC), states:

The first ruler who came after the foreigners who are the Medes [Persians] was Pharaoh Amenirdais [Amyrtaios].

— from the Demotic Chronicle

Amyrtaeus was probably the grandson of the Amyrtaeus of Sais who, with Inaros II (himself a grandson of Pharaoh Psamtik III), led a rebellion between 465 BC and 463 BC against the Satrap of Artaxerxes I. He is known from Aramaic and ancient Greek sources, and is mentioned in the Demotic Chronicle. A "virtually unknown ruler", he is not known to have left any monuments, and his name in Egyptian is only reconstructed from demotic notices: no hieroglyphic writing of his names has been found.

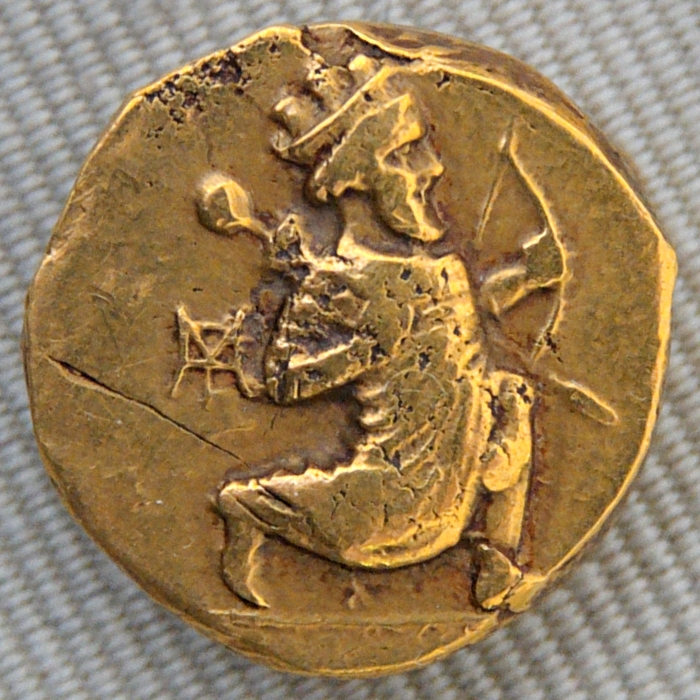
Daric of Artaxerxes II, against whom Amyrtaeus rebelled. Cabinet des Médailles, Paris.

=== Coup and reign ===
Before assuming the throne of Egypt, Amyrtaeus had revolted against the Persian King Darius II (423–404 BC) as early as 411 BC, leading a guerrilla action in the western Nile Delta around his home city of Sais.

Following the death of Darius, Amyrtaeus declared himself king in 404 BC. According to Isocrates, Artaxerxes II assembled an army in Phoenicia under the command of Abrocomas to retake Egypt shortly after coming to the Persian throne, but political problems with his brother Cyrus the Younger prevented this from taking place, allowing the Egyptians sufficient time to throw off Achaemenid rule. While the rule of Amyrtaeus in the western Delta was established by 404 BC, Artaxerxes II continued to be recognized as king at Elephantine as late as 401 BC, but Aramaic papyri from the site refer to Regnal Year 5 of "Amortis" in September 400 BC. The Elephantine papyri also demonstrate that between 404 and 400 BC (or even 398 BC) Upper Egypt remained under Persian control, while the forces of Amyrtaeus dominated the Delta.

In 1st century BC, the Greek historian Diodorus Siculus wrote in his Bibliotheca historica (XIV, 35.3–5) that a King named Psamtik — which seems to be identified with Amyrtaeus, perhaps being "Psamtik" his lost regnal name — murdered the Greek admiral Tamos who had taken refuge in Egypt after the defeat of the rebel Cyrus. If the information was correct, Amyrtaeus would seem to have acted in this way to ingratiate himself with Artaxerxes II. It is likely that King Amyrtaeus concluded an alliance with Sparta implying that Egypt was provided with military aid by Sparta in exchange for grain.

=== Fall and death ===
Amyrtaeus was defeated in open battle by his successor, Nepherites I of Mendes and executed at Memphis, an event which the Aramaic papyrus Brooklyn 13 implies occurred in October 399 BC. Nepherites I then transferred the capital to Mendes (Lower Egypt). There is no further information available regarding Amyrtaeus' rule, fall and death. Nepherites I reigned until 393 BC, being succeeded by his designated heir, his son Hakor.

== Bibliography ==
- Cimmino, Franco (2003). Dizionario delle Dinastie Faraoniche. Milan: Bompiani. ISBN 978-8845255311.
- Clayton, Peter A. (1999). Chronicles of the Pharaohs. London: Thames and Hudson. ISBN 978-0500050743.
- Lemaire, A. (1995). La fin de la première période perse in Égypte et la chronologie judéene vers 400 av. J.-C., Transeuphratène 9, Leuven: Peeters Publishers. pp. 51–61.
- Lloyd, Alan B. (2003). The Late Period, in The Oxford History of Ancient Egypt, edited by I. Shaw. Oxford: University Press. ISBN 978-0192804587.
- Perdu, O. (2010). Saites and Persians (664—332), in A.B. Lloyd (ed.), A Companion to Ancient Egypt Chichester: Wiley-Blackwell. ISBN 978-1118785140. pp. 140–58 (at pp. 153–7).
- Ray, J.D. (1987). Egypt: Dependence and Independence (425-343 B.C.), in: Achaemenid History I: Sources, Structures, and Syntheses, edited by H. Sancisi-Weerdenburg. Leiden: Nederlands Instituut voor het Nabije Oosten. pp. 79–95.

Amyrtaeus Twenty-eighth Dynasty of Egypt Born: ? Died: October 399 BC
Preceded by Darius II	Pharaoh of Egypt; 404–399 BC	Succeeded by Nepherites I
