= 506th Airborne Infantry Regiment Association =

Charitable veterans' organization

- Formation: 1942
- Type: 501(c)(19) nonprofit organization
- Purpose: financial assistance programs for the families of soldiers killed or wounded in action, academic scholarships sponsoring, packages for soldiers deployed overseas
- Region served: United States
- Members: 3,600
- Website: https://www.506infantry.org/

The 506th Airborne Infantry Regiment Association (Airmobile – Air Assault) is a non-profit American veterans' organization of the U.S. Army 506th Airborne Infantry Regiment. It has approximately 3,600 members, including veterans from the regiment's founding in 1942.

Association membership is open to current and former members of the 506th and their families, current and former members of units attached to or supporting the 506th, and others with a special connection or association with the 506th.

== Organization and status ==
The association was incorporated in California in 2000 and became a non-profit organization in 2001. In addition, the Internal Revenue Service recognized the association as a Section 501(c)(19) War Veterans organization.

The association sponsors academic scholarships, packages for soldiers deployed overseas, and financial assistance programs for the families of soldiers killed or wounded in action.

The association is an all-volunteer organization with about 3,600 rostered members. It operates independently of the 101st Airborne Division Association, but maintains close working relations with that group and with other related veterans’ organizations. The association holds member reunions every two years around the United States.

=== Motto ===
The association's motto — We stand together – then, now and always — is derived from the regimental motto of Currahee! – Cherokee language for “Stand Alone,”. This is the name of the mountain in the World War II paratrooper training center at Camp Toccoa, Georgia. The name Currahee also designates members and former members of the regiment.

== History ==
In fall 1995, two Vietnam War veterans from the 506th - Bob Acklen (B&C, 3rd Bn-1969/70) and Gene Overton (C, 1st Bn-1967/68) - began gathering contact information of former Currahees. They wanted to facilitate communication among Currahees, to interact with active duty troops preserve the regimental history, and to honor the deceased. In December 1995, Acklen and Overton mailed the first newsletter to about 450 Currahees. By May 1996, the mailing list had grown to 800 Currahees.

On July 11 to 13, 1996, a gathering of Vietnam-era Currahees was held at Fort Campbell, Kentucky About 88 Currahees attended the event This reunion was the first significant event to involve all generations of Currahees, At that reunion, 53 Currahees attended an organizational meeting to discuss forming a veterans' group for their regiment. The decision was to move forward, and four veterans were tasked with researching it.

Since most of the Currahees at the Fort Campbell meeting were from the Airborne Battle Group era or Vietnam era, the question was whether Currahees from the World War II era would be interested in joining the proposed association. Association representatives attended the 101st Airborne Division Association's 1996 Reunion in St. Louis, Missouri, on August 8–10, 1996. After the representatives present their proposal to the 40 to 50 World War II era Currahees there, they received a positive response. The decision was made to open the association for all Currahees.

Organizational meetings were held at reunions in 1997 and 1998. At the latter event, the first organizational elections were held. A board of directors and association officers were elected .

The 1997 Currahee Veterans Reunion in Knoxville, Tennessee, included 68 Currahees. The largest group was 39 from the World War II era, followed by 25 troopers from the Vietnam era.

== Programs ==
The Currahee website came online in November 1996. It soon evolved from a communication vehicle into a website of historic and contemporary documents, pictures and maps, 4,000 pages of information and 3,000 photographs and maps. It has 60,000 visitors a year. The association also publishes a newsletter The Currahee! and a Currahee blog.

The Quartermaster function was created to sell Currahee-marked apparel, flags and mementos. These sales are a strong revenue source for the association.

The 506th regiment was deployed abroad during the Iraq War, the Afghanistan War, and for peacekeeping in South Korea. In response, the association started new assistance programs for soldiers and their families. In the period from 2004 to 2009, association awarded scholarships, grants and unit support of more than $55,000. The principal award programs are:

- A scholarship program to Currahees and their children. This Scholarship Fund was established with seed money from SFC(R) Joseph F. Foster, Jr. (HHC, 2nd Bn, 1969–70) and SSG(R) Melissa D. Snock (Associate Member).
- Financial assistance to wounded vets and the survivors of those killed in action. The Widows, Orphans and Wounded Soldiers (WOWS) fund was established by a gift from Thomas G. Lee (CSC, 1st Bn, 1987–88).
- The Packages program sent "CARE" packages of morale-building food and relaxation materials for troops on combat assignments.
- Unit recognition programs distributed flags and other symbols of support to combat units.
- Currahee veterans have visited wounded veterans in hospitals
- Other Currahee veterans have attended graveside ceremonies for Currahees killed in action.

The association also provides the following services:

- Facilitating communication between Currahees who have lost track of each other.
- Enabling Currahees to gain needed closure about the combat death of a loved one by communicating with their fellow soldiers; these, in turn, are finally able to share with the families of lost friends their feelings and sympathies.
- Providing confirmations of service for Currahees who are trying to qualify for veterans benefits, but are missing documentation.
- Research material for students and scholars on the 506th regiment.

The association has an active link to the units deployed in South Korea, Iraq and Afghanistan as the association's Active Duty/Veteran Liaison. The association is providing financial backing of the Currahee Rendezvous '09. It has also been raising funds to build a monument to the over 1400 soldiers of the regiment who have been killed in action.
