= Twenty-eighth Dynasty of Egypt =

404–398 BC single-pharaoh ancient Egyptian dynasty

- 404 BC–398 BC
- Capital: Sais
- Common languages: Egyptian language
- Religion: Ancient Egyptian Religion
- Government: Absolute monarchy
- Historical era: Classical antiquity
  - End of Satrapy: 404 BC
  - Deposition of Amyrtaeus: 398 BC
Preceded by	Succeeded by
Twenty-seventh Dynasty of Egypt	Twenty-ninth Dynasty of Egypt

The Twenty-eighth Dynasty of Egypt (notated Dynasty XXVIII, alternatively 28th Dynasty or Dynasty 28) is usually classified as the third dynasty of the Ancient Egyptian Late Period. The 28th Dynasty lasted from 404 BC to 398 BC and it includes only one Pharaoh, Amyrtaeus (Amenirdis), also known as Psamtik V or Psammetichus V. Amyrtaeus was probably the grandson of the Amyrtaeus of Sais, who carried on a rebellion in 465–463 BC with the Egyptian chief, Inarus (himself a grandson of Psamtik III), against the satrap Achaemenes of Achaemenid Egypt.

== History ==
At the end of the 5th century BC, Amyrtaeus, a native Egyptian, revolted against Darius II, the Achaemenid Persian King and the last Pharaoh of the 27th Dynasty. Amyrtaeus succeeded in expelling the Persians from Memphis in 405 BC with assistance from Cretan mercenaries, and in 404 BC, following the death of Darius, proclaimed himself Pharaoh of Egypt. Artaxerxes II, Darius' successor as King of Persia, attempted to lead an expedition to retake Egypt but he failed to do so, due to political problems with his brother, Cyrus the Younger. This allowed Amyrtaeus to consolidate his rule over Egypt.

Very little is known about Amyrtaeus' reign. No monuments from this dynasty have been found.

In 398 BC Amyrtaeus was overthrown and executed by Nefaarud I, ending the 28th Dynasty and beginning the 29th Dynasty.

== Pharaohs of the 28th Dynasty ==
Pharaoh	Cartouche	Reign	Throne Name	Comments
Amyrtaeus / Amenirdisu (Psamtik V / Psammetichus V)	i mn n i A2 ir D37 z	404-398 BC		Ended the Achaemenid rule. Founder of 28th Dynasty

== Sources ==
- O. Perdu, 'Saites and Persians (664-332),' in A.B. Lloyd (ed.), A Companion to Ancient Egypt (Chichester, 2010), 140-58 (at 153–7).
- J.D. Ray, 'Egypt: Dependence and Independence (425-343 B.C.)', in Achaemenid History 1 (Leiden, 1987), 79–95.

== See also ==
- Achaemenid Egypt topics
- History of Ancient Egypt

Preceded by Twenty-seventh Dynasty	Dynasties of Egypt c. 404 BC–398 BC	Succeeded by Twenty-ninth Dynasty
