= Siege of Syracuse (311–309 BC) =

311-309 BCE military investment of Syracuse by the Carthaginians

- Part of The Sicilian Wars
Date	311–309 BC
Location	Syracuse, Sicily, Italy
Result	Greek victory

Belligerents
Carthage	Syracuse

Commanders and leaders
Hamilcar	Agathocles of Syracuse; Antander; Erymnon the Aetolian

Strength
120,000 infantry 5,000 cavalry Modern estimate: 30,000–36,000 infantry 4,000–4,500 cavalry	Counterattack: 3,000 infantry 400 cavalry Unknown number of extra forces in the city

The siege of Syracuse by the Carthaginians from 311 to 309 BC followed shortly after the Battle of the Himera River in the same year. In that battle the Carthaginians, under the leadership of Hamilcar the son of Gisco, had defeated the tyrant of Syracuse, Agathocles. Agathocles had to retreat to Syracuse and lost control over the other Greek cities on Sicily, who went over to the Carthaginian side.

When Hamilcar besieged Syracuse and blockaded its port, Agathocles did not confront him on the field. Instead, he made the audacious but very risky decision to invade Libya, the homeland of the Carthaginians. He managed to escape the naval blockade and had some successes in his expedition to Libya. Hamilcar had to send a part of his army back to Carthage to reinforce Libya. In 310 BC a first assault on the walls of Syracuse failed.

In 309 BC, Hamilcar attacked again in the cover of night to obtain the element of surprise. His advance on the walls was made in disorder however, and the Carthaginians were in turn surprised by a counterattack from the Syracusans. Even though the Carthaginians heavily outnumbered the Syracusans, the element of surprise, the darkness of night and the terrain made the Carthaginian army flee. Hamilcar was captured and killed by the Syracusans. The naval blockade was finally broken in 307 BC by Agathocles himself, when he had temporarily returned to Sicily.

== Prelude ==
The armies of Hamilcar and Agathocles clashed in the Battle of the Himera River in 311 BC. Agathocles suffered a disastrous defeat, a large part of his army was killed or taken prisoner by the Carthaginians. He gathered the survivors, burned his camp and withdrew to Gela. There he remained for some time to divert the Carthaginian army from Syracuse. This allowed the Syracusans to harvest their crops. Hamilcar first besieged Gela, but gave up when he discovered that Agathocles had large supplies and enough soldiers to defend the city. He then visited the cities and strongholds which were still siding with Agathocles to win them over. Because they despised Agathocles they soon deserted to the Carthaginians.

As the siege of Gela was lifted, Agathocles escaped to Syracuse with the remains of his army. He supplied the city with the grain harvest from the countryside and repaired the damaged sections of the city walls. He lost control over the rest of Sicily, while Carthage had gained superiority in land and naval forces.

At this point the future looked bleak for Agathocles. With the odds against him, Agathocles decided against fighting the Carthaginian army on Sicily. In secret, he decided to pursue an unexpected and very risky invasion of Libya, the heartland of Carthage. By doing so he intended to divert Carthaginian military power from Syracuse. In Libya he wanted to incite the Libyan allies of Carthage to revolt and plunder the wealthy territory of Carthage. Also, his experienced army would have an edge over the Carthaginian forces there, which were not as battle-hardened as their forces on Sicily.

== Siege ==
Agathocles appointed his brother Antander as the leader of Syracuse and left him an adequate garrison to defend the city. To prevent an uprising in Syracuse to take place during his expedition to Libya, he separated families so that one group would be left in the city and one group would join his invasion of Libya. Even if those who remained despised Agathocles, they would not be inclined to rebellion out of care for their relatives who were with Agathocles.

Because he needed money for his campaign, he took the property of orphans, borrowed from merchants, took dedications from temples and the jewels of the women. He invited the wealthy citizens, who most opposed his rule, to leave the city voluntarily. As they left, he sent his mercenaries to kill them. He then seized their property and freed their slaves who were fit for military service. In this manner he gathered a large amount of wealth.

=== Agathocles departs to Libya ===
The Carthaginians were blockading the harbor of Syracuse with a fleet of triremes which greatly outnumbered the sixty ships of Agathocles had manned. Agathocles had to wait for a suitable opportunity to leave Syracuse. This moment came when a few grain ships en route for the harbor of Syracuse arrived. When the Carthaginian fleet temporarily lifted the blockade to chase the grain ships, Agathocles quickly led his fleet out of the port.

The Carthaginians at first thought Agathocles intended to rescue the grain ships, so they turned to face him in a battle formation. When they noticed the Greek fleet was escaping and getting a headstart, they proceeded to pursue it. Meanwhile, the grain ships entered the port and brought welcome relief to the city, were food was already becoming scarce. The Greek fleet was almost overtaken by the Carthaginians, but was saved when night set in, making further pursuit impossible. A solar eclipse which was observed the next day allows for pinpointing the date of August the 15th in 310 BC.

=== Uncertainty over the fate of Agathocles in Syracuse ===
When Agathocles arrived in Libya, he burned his fleet to remove any means of escape for his soldiers. Also, he did not want to leave a part of his force to guard the triremes or allow them to be captured by the Carthaginians. When Agathocles had left the landing site, the Carthaginians took the bronze beaks of the burnt Greek ships to Carthage. Agathocles proceeded to loot and destroy the cities of Megalepolis and White Tunis and defeated the Carthaginians in the Battle of White Tunis in the same year.

After their defeat in the battle of White Tunis the Carthaginians sent messengers to Hamilcar in Sicily. They asked him for assistance as soon as possible and delivered him the bronze beaks of the Greek ships. Hamilcar sent some of the messengers to Syracuse with the bronze beaks. They presented the beaks as evidence to convince the Syracusans that the army of Agathocles had been destroyed and to ask for their surrender. Many inhabitants believed the story and mourned their lost relatives, but the magistrates were in doubt and turned away the Carthaginian messengers. Even so, some desperate citizens fled the city and were offered safety by Hamilcar. Hamilcar, thinking that the morale of the Syracusans was broken and that they lacked men to defend the city, prepared to assault the walls of Syracuse.

Hamilcar offered safety to Antander and the other leaders if they surrendered the city. However Erymnon the Aetolian, who had been appointed co-ruler with him by Agathocles, disagreed. He convinced the leading men to wait until they had more certainty of the fate of Agathocles. Meanwhile, Agathocles had built two ships and sent them to Syracuse to bring news of his victory in Libya. As they approached Syracuse they were spotted by Carthaginian ships, which pursued them. The Greek ships barely managed to escape and entered the port of Syracuse. There, the inhabitants of the city, including those who defended the walls, quickly gathered to hear the news.

=== The first Carthaginian assault repelled ===
Hamilcar noticed the walls were now undefended when the inhabitants flocked to the port and exploited this mistake. He sent his strongest troops to the walls with scaling ladders and climbed the walls without being noticed. When they were about to occupy the walls, they were spotted and attacked by Greek guards on patrol. The guards were quickly joined by other defenders, who arrived before the Carthaginian reinforcements. The Greeks got the upper hand and killed some of the attackers, who retreated. Hamilcar withdrew his army from the walls. Because he had not been able to take Syracuse that day, he decided to send 5000 soldiers to the aid of Carthage in response to the request of the messengers.

=== Surprise counterattack on the second assault ===
At this point the siege had progressed to 309 BC. Hamilcar had by now occupied the area around the Olympieum (which was situated south of the city on the shore of the Great Harbour, near the mouth of the Anapus River) and prepared a second attack on the walls. When the Syracusans learned of this, they sent 3,000 infantry and 400 cavalry to Euryalus Castle, which was part of the defensive walls. The Carthaginian army was much larger, with 120,000 infantry and 5,000 cavalry. In opposition to this estimate of Diodorus Siculus, a modern estimate for the size of the Carthaginian army is 30,000 to 36,000 infantry and 4,000 to 4,500 cavalry.

The Carthaginians advanced towards the walls at night to avoid being seen, with Hamilcar at the front. He was followed by the Syracusan exile Deinocrates, who commanded the cavalry. The infantry was divided in two groups, one composed of Carthaginians and the other with the Greek allies of Carthage. They were followed by an unruly crowd of camp followers who wished to profit from the eventual plunder of Syracuse. Because the roads were rough and narrow, fights broke out between the camp followers and the baggage train over the right of way. This created significant confusion and disorder in the Carthaginian ranks.

The chaotic advance of the Carthaginian army had not gone unnoticed by the Syracusans at Euryalus Castle. They sallied forth and capitalized on the confusion of their enemy, attacking them from higher ground. Because of the darkness of night the Carthaginian army thought they were being attacked by a much larger force. Being in disarray, in a disadvantaged position and unaware of the terrain, the Carthaginian army routed. Because the roads were narrow, some of the Carthaginian infantry were trampled by their own cavalry. In the darkness some of them even fought among themselves because they took each other for enemies. Hamilcar himself stood his ground, but he was captured alive by the Syracusans as the soldiers around him fled.

== Aftermath ==
The next day Hamilcar was paraded through Syracuse and killed after he was brutalized by the inhabitants. His head was cut off and sent to Agathocles in Libya to show the victory at Syracuse. The scattered Carthaginians were gathered with difficulty. Without Hamilcar to hold the army together, the Greek allies separated from the Carthaginians and elected Deinocrates as their general. The leadership of the Carthaginian army was given to those second in command to Hamilcar.

The city of Acragas, which was among the Greek allies of Carthage, now thought the time was ripe to take the leadership of Sicily for itself. They considered Carthage and Syracuse to be severely weakened. Under the leadership of their general Xenodicus they proceeded to liberate the cities Gela, Enna and Erbessus from Carthaginian control and restore their autonomy. Eventually though the Acragantines were defeated by the Syracusans in 307 BC.

While the Carthaginian army had been defeated, their navy was still blockading the port of Syracuse. The city still suffered from famine and the blockade made it difficult to supply the inhabitants with grain. The blockading fleet was defeated in 307 BC when Agathocles had temporarily returned to Sicily.

== Notes ==
1. In classical antiquity the name Libya referred to Ancient Libya, which extended from modern Morocco to the western border of Ancient Egypt.

== Sources ==
- Diodorus Siculus (1954). Geer, Russell M. (ed.). Library of History. Vol. 10. Cambridge, Massachusetts: Harvard University Press. ISBN 978-0-674-99429-4.
- Ray, Fred Eugene (2009). Greek and Macedonian Land Battles of the 4th Century B.C.: A History and Analysis of 187 Engagements. Jefferson, North Carolina: McFarland & Company. ISBN 978-1-4766-0006-2.
