= Abrocomas =

4th-century BC Iranian satrap

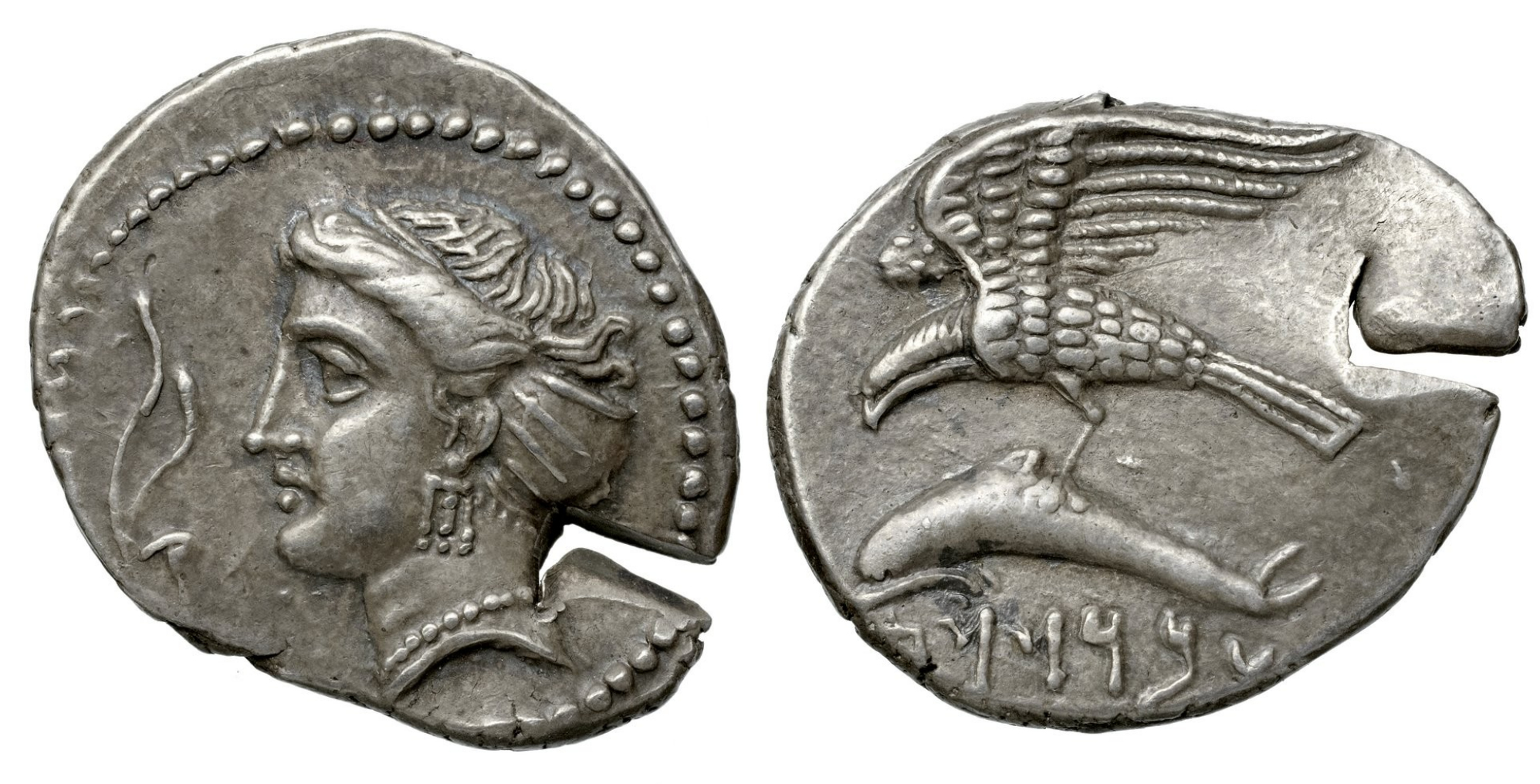
Possible coinage of Abrocomas, Sinope, Paphlagonia.

Abrocomas (Ancient Greek: Ἀβροκόμας) was satrap of Syria for the Achaemenid king Artaxerxes II Mnemon. He may also have been satrap of Paphlagonia, with its capital at Sinope, according to the reading of some of the coinage of Sinope: the Aramaic reading "ˈbrkmw" has been identified as the name rendered in Greek as "Abrocomas", but this is not universally accepted.

Abrocomas was sent with an army of 300,000 men to oppose Cyrus the Younger on his march into Upper Asia. On Cyrus's arrival at Tarsus in 401 BC, Abrocomas was said to be on the Euphrates. At Issus four hundred heavy-armed Greeks, who had deserted Abrocomas, joined Cyrus. Abrocomas did not defend the Syrian passes, as was expected, but marched to join the king. He burnt some boats to prevent Cyrus from crossing the Euphrates, but did not arrive in time for the battle of Cunaxa.

In about 385, with Persian generals Pharnabazus and Tithraustes, Abrocomas unsuccessfully attempted to reconquer Egypt for the Persian Empire.
