= 435 BC =

435 BC in various calendars
- Gregorian calendar: 435 BC; CDXXXV BC
- Ab urbe condita: 319
- Ancient Egypt era: XXVII dynasty, 91
- Pharaoh: Artaxerxes I of Persia, 31
- Ancient Greek Olympiad (summer): 86th Olympiad, year 2
- Assyrian calendar: 4316
- Balinese saka calendar: N/A
- Bengali calendar: −1028 – −1027
- Berber calendar: 516
- Buddhist calendar: 110
- Burmese calendar: −1072
- Byzantine calendar: 5074–5075
- Chinese calendar: 乙巳年 (Wood Snake); 2263 or 2056 — to — 丙午年 (Fire Horse); 2264 or 2057
- Coptic calendar: −718 – −717
- Discordian calendar: 732
- Ethiopian calendar: −442 – −441
- Hebrew calendar: 3326–3327
- Hindu calendars
- Vikram Samvat: −378 – −377
- Shaka Samvat: N/A
- Kali Yuga: 2666–2667
- Holocene calendar: 9566
- Iranian calendar: 1056 BP – 1055 BP
- Islamic calendar: 1088 BH – 1087 BH
- Javanese calendar: N/A
- Julian calendar: N/A
- Korean calendar: 1899
- Minguo calendar: 2346 before ROC 民前2346年
- Nanakshahi calendar: −1902
- Thai solar calendar: 108–109
- Tibetan calendar: ཤིང་མོ་སྦྲུལ་ལོ་ (female Wood-Snake) −308 or −689 or −1461 — to — མེ་ཕོ་རྟ་ལོ་ (male Fire-Horse) −307 or −688 or −1460

Year 435 BC was a year of the pre-Julian Roman calendar. At the time, it was known as the First year of the Consulship of Iullus and Tricostus (or, less frequently, year 319 Ab urbe condita). The denomination 435 BC for this year has been used since the early medieval period, when the Anno Domini calendar era became the prevalent method in Europe for naming years.

== Events ==
=== By place ===
==== Greece ====
- A dispute arises between Epidamnus' oligarchs and democratic forces in the Greek colony. Most of the colony's inhabitants originate from Corinth or Corcyra (Corfu). Epidamnus' oligarchs are exiled and then appeal to Corcyra for help, while the democrats enlist the support of Corinth. Corcyra is then attacked by Corinth as the dispute heats up.

==== Italy ====
- Forces of the Roman Republic, led by dictator Quintus Servilius Priscus, captured the nearby city of Fidenae by tunneling in through the hill the town was built upon. He was awarded the cognomen 'Fidenas' as a reward for his success.

=== By topic ===
==== Art ====
- A gold and ivory statue of Zeus, king of the gods, is completed at Elis by the Athenian sculptor Phidias for the Temple of Zeus at Olympia. The statue becomes one of the Seven Wonders of the World. The Olympian Zeus is about seven times life size (or 13 metres) and occupies the full height of the temple.

== Births ==
- Philoxenus of Cythera, Greek dithyrambic poet (d. 380 BC)
