= Nepherites II =

Egyptian pharaoh during 380 BC

- Nefaarud II

Pharaoh
- Reign: Summer 380 BC
- Predecessor: Hakor
- Successor: Nectanebo I
Royal titulary
Nomen
Nefaarud
The Great Ones prosper
- Father: Hakor
- Died: 380 BC
- Dynasty: 29th Dynasty

Nepherites II or Nefaarud II was the last pharaoh of the feeble and short-lived Twenty-ninth Dynasty (399/398–380 BC), the penultimate native dynasty of Egypt.

== Short reign ==
An "ineffectual" ruler, Nepherites II became pharaoh of Egypt in 380 BC after the death of his father Hakor (393–380 BC) and was deposed and likely killed by the rebel prince Nakhtnebef of Sebennytos – the future Nectanebo I, an Egyptian military officer, after ruling Egypt for only 4 months, from June to September 380 BC.

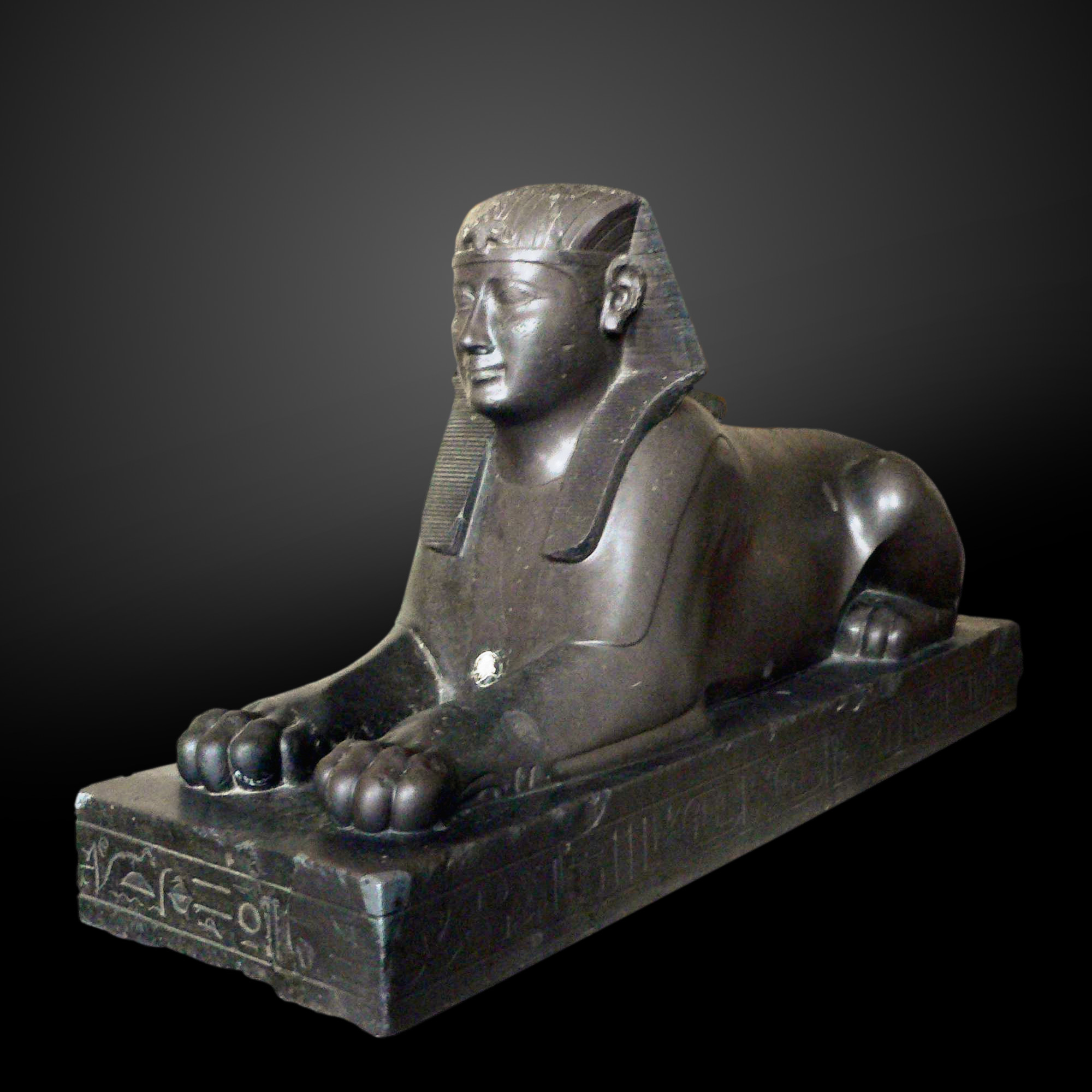
Androsphinx of Pharaoh Hakor, Nepherites II's father. Louvre, Paris.

King Hakor had already to face, towards the end of his reign, frequent riots likely inspired by Nectanebo. Pharaoh Nectanebo I, who founded the Thirtieth Dynasty of Egypt after overthrowing Nepherites II, reigned until his death in 360 BC and represented the third Delta family to assume the rule of the country in just two decades: a signal that Egypt's last phase of independence under native rulers, begun with Amyrtaeus' coup in 404 BC against Persia, was particularly unstable. A quick reference to Nepherites II's fall can be found in a large limestone stela Nectanebo I commissioned in Hermopolis:

[...] the disaster of the king who came before [...]

— Nectanebo I, Hermopolis stela

The Greek historian Theopompus (c. 380–315 BC) links Nepherites II's end with the war led by King Evagoras I of Salamis on Cyprus against Persia. In a desperate attempt to strengthen his own position, Nepherites II proclaimed himself Wehem Mesut, "Repetitor Of Births" (i.e. Founder of a new era), "like few other sovereigns of the past of very different stature", such as Amenemhat I and Seti I.

His nomen or birth name, meaning "The Great Ones prosper", does not appear on any monument, and it is only attested in Manetho's Aegyptiaca and in the 3rd century BC Demotic Chronicle.

== Bibliography ==
- Cimmino, Franco (2003). Dizionario delle Dinastie Faraoniche. Milan: Bompiani. ISBN 978-8845255311.
- Clayton, Peter A. (1999). Chronicles of the Pharaohs. London: Thames and Hudson. ISBN 978-0500050743.
- Wilkinson, Toby (2011). The Rise and Fall of Ancient Egypt. London: Bloomsbury. ISBN 978-1408810026.

Preceded by Hakor	Pharaoh of Egypt; Twenty-Ninth Dynasty	Succeeded by Nectanebo I
