= John D. Ray =

British Egyptologist (born 1945)

John David Ray (born 22 December 1945) is a British Egyptologist and academic. He is the former Sir Herbert Thompson Professor of Egyptology at the University of Cambridge. His principal field of interest covers the Late and Hellenistic periods of Egypt, with special reference to documents in the demotic script, and he is also known for deciphering the Carian script, a writing system used by Anatolian mercenaries who fought for the late-period Egyptians.

== Early life ==
Ray was born on 22 December 1945. He was educated at Latymer Upper School, a private school in London. He went on to study at Trinity Hall, Cambridge. He graduated Bachelor of Arts (BA), later promoted to Master of Arts (MA Cantab). While at Cambridge, he was awarded the Thomas Young Medal for 'outstanding distinction in any branch of oriental archaeology'.

== Academic career ==
Following his graduation from university, Ray spent some of 1970 working at the British Museum as a research assistant in the Department of Egyptian Antiquities. He then joined the University of Birmingham, where he was a Lecturer in Egyptology from 1970 to 1977. In 1977, he joined the University of Cambridge as a Reader in Egyptology. In 1979, he was elected a Fellow of Selwyn College in addition to his university post. He was promoted to Professor and appointed to the Sir Herbert Thompson Chair in Egyptology in 2005.

He retired in 2013 and was appointed professor emeritus.

== Personal life ==
Ray is married to The Reverend Sonia Falaschi-Ray, a Church of England priest.

== Honours ==
Ray was elected Fellow of the Society of Antiquaries of London (FSA) on 11 May 2000. In 2004, he was elected Fellow of the British Academy (FBA).

== Works ==
- Reflections of Osiris: lives from ancient Egypt (Oxford University Press, 2002, ISBN 978-0-19-515871-7)
- The Rosetta Stone and the Rebirth of Ancient Egypt (Harvard University Press, 2007, ISBN 978-0-674-02493-9).
