= Hakor =

29th Dynasty Egyptian pharaoh

- Achoris, Hakoris, Hagar
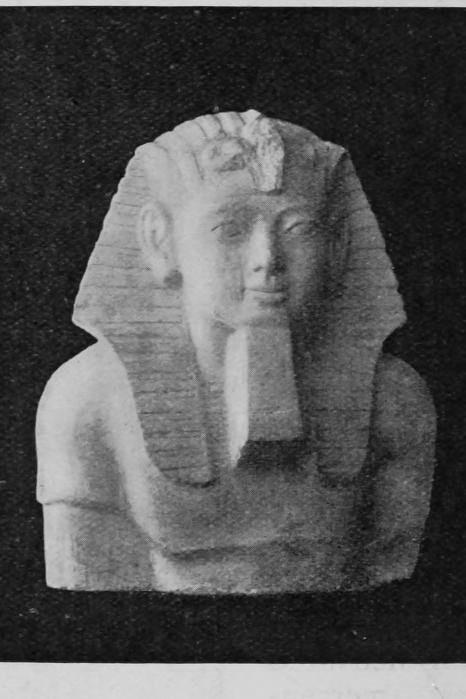
- Upper half of statue of Hakor. In Cairo Museum

Pharaoh
- Reign: 392/1–379/8 BCE
- Predecessor: Nepherites I (392/1 BCE); Psammuthes (390/89 BCE)
- Successor: Psammuthes (391/0 BCE); Nepherites II (379/8 BCE)
Royal titulary
Horus name
Aaib Merytawy
ꜥꜣ-ỉb-mry-tꜣwy
Great of intellect who loves the Two Lands
G5	aA ib Z1 N36 N17 N17
Nebty name
Qenu
qnw
The Brave
G16	q W24 Z9 D40
Golden Horus
Sehetep Netjeru
sḥtp nṯrw
Satisfying the gods
G8	s Htp t p nTrw
Prenomen
Khnemmaatre
ẖnm-m3ˁ.t-Rˁ
Who embraces the maat of Ra
M23 t L2 t < ra Xnm C10 >
Khnemmaatre Setepenkhnemu
ẖnm-m3ˁ.t-Rˁ-stp-n-ẖnmw
Who embraces the maat of Ra, the chosen one of Khnum
M23 t L2 t < ra Xnm C10 C4 stp n >
Nomen
Hakor
hkr
G39 N5 < h k r >
Hagar
hgr
The Arab / the Bedouin
G39 N5 < h g rw >
- Children: Nepherites II
- Father: Nepherites I?
- Died: 379/8 BC
- Dynasty: 29th Dynasty

Hakor or Hagar, also known by the hellenized forms Achoris or Hakoris, was an ancient Egyptian pharaoh of the 29th Dynasty. His reign marks the apex of this feeble and short-lived dynasty, having ruled for 13 years – more than half of its entire duration.

== Reign ==
=== Struggle for the accession ===
Hakor's accession and relationships with his predecessor Nepherites I were long debated. After Nepherites' death a dynastic struggle did seem to have occurred, and the throne was claimed by two or maybe three pretenders: Hakor, Psammuthes, and possibly a phantom figure called Muthis who was only mentioned in Eusebius' epitome of Manetho's Aegyptiaca. As a result, Hakor was alternately considered Nepherites' legitimate successor or an unrelated usurper.

In 1986, John D. Ray suggested that Hakor was Nepherites' heir, who ruled undisturbed until his Year 2 when he was deposed by Psammuthes. After another year, Hakor managed to retake his legitimate throne by overthrowing the usurper, and continued to date his reign since his first coronation date, simply pretending that this gap never occurred. The third pretender, Muthis, could be inserted within this struggle, but his role – assuming that he really did exist – is unknown. Ray's hypothesis is accepted by other Egyptologists such as Alan B. Lloyd and Toby Wilkinson.

Shortly after his death, Hakor was called an usurper by the founder of the subsequent dynasty, Nectanebo I. However, it has been suggested that Hakor and Nectanebo might have been relatives in some way, possibly both related to Nepherites I but rivals to each other.

=== Activities in Egypt ===
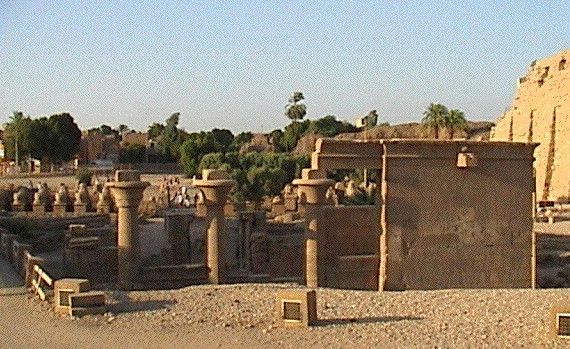
Hakor's chapel in Karnak

Once re-established, Hakor made considerable exertions to affirm his legitimacy, putting emphasis on his – real or fictional – descent from Nepherites. His building activity was remarkable and he also extensively restored many monuments of his royal predecessors.

In Karnak, Hakor finished the chapel for the sacred barque of Amun-Ra near the first pylon which was started by Psammuthes or possibly by Nepherites I; he also possibly began a temple complex in northern Saqqara which was later further developed under Nectanebo II. His building activity is well attested in various places in Upper Egypt (Luxor, Medinet Habu, El-Kab, El-Tod, Medamud, Elephantine), in the Temple of Hibis of Kharga Oasis, as well as other locations in Middle Egypt.

=== Foreign relations ===
Hakor apparently reprised Nepherites' foreign policy. In Aristophanes' comedy Plutus, which was performed in 388 BCE, an alliance between the Athenians and the Egyptians is mentioned, though it was more likely intended to refer to the Athenian support for the rebellion of Evagoras I of Cyprus – himself allied with Hakor – against the Achaemenids. Theopompus also reported an alliance between Hakor and the Pisidians. The peace of Antalcidas between the Persians and Greeks (387 BCE) was a turning point: after that, Egypt and Cyprus remained the only opponents of Artaxerxes II as reported by Theopompus and Orosius. The following years are quite obscure, but it seems that the Persians first attacked Egypt in 385 BCE and, after three years of war, the Egyptians managed to defeat the invaders; The Athenian rhetorician Isocrates mentioned this war vaguely and disparagingly.

In 381 BCE, Hakor sent aid, money and 50 triremes (apparently without crew, though) to Evagoras in order to contribute to his resistance against the Great King who, after the unsuccessful campaign in Egypt, was now focusing on Cyprus. However, when, in 380 BCE, Evagoras travelled to Egypt to beg for further aid, Hakor saw no need to continue supporting him and sent him back to Cyprus with merely some more money. Evagoras surrendered to Artaxerxes soon after, but Hakor promptly joined a short-lived alliance with Sparta and with Glos, son of the Egyptian admiral, Tamos, who was a supporter of the pretender Cyrus the Younger against Artaxerxes II. Hakor managed to get the Athenian general Chabrias into his service, but the Persian general Pharnabazus II lobbied Athens seeking for them to repatriate him.

=== Death and succession ===
Hakor died in 379/8 BCE, leaving his throne to his son Nepherites II. However, the latter was able to keep it for just four months before being overthrown and replaced by an army general from Sebennytos, Nectanebo I.

== Burial ==
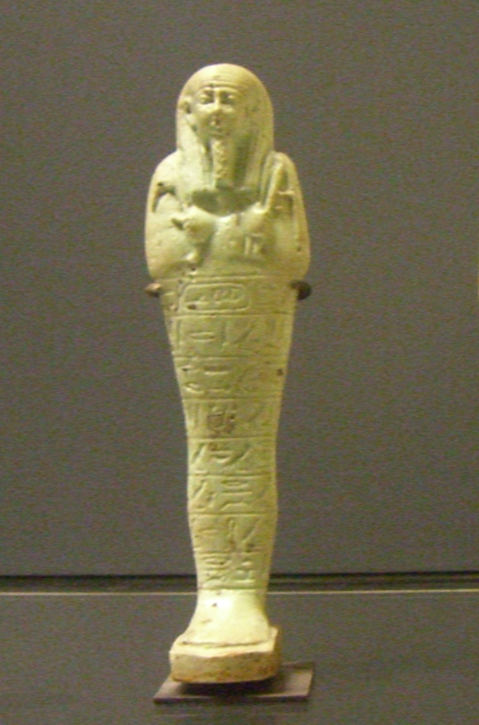
Ushabti of pharaoh Hakor, found at Mendes

At Mendes(?), the Tomb of Hakor has not been found. Only one funerary object can be linked to Hakor, a Ushabti inscribed with his name, that was found at Mendes. This may indicate his tomb was looted in antiquity, but this hypothesis is unproven.

== Bibliography ==
- Clayton, Peter (1994). Chronicle of the Pharaohs. London: Thames & Hudson Ltd. ISBN 9780500050743.
- Depuydt, Leo (2006). "Saite and Persian Egypt, 664 BC - 332 BC". In Hornung, Erik; Krauss, Rolf; Warburton, David A. (eds.). Ancient Egyptian Chronology. Brill, Leiden/Boston. pp. 265–283. ISBN 978-90-04-11385-5.
- Fine, John V. A. (1983). The Ancient Greeks: A critical history. Harvard University Press. ISBN 978-0674033146.
- Gardiner, Alan H. (1966) [1961]. Egypt of the Pharaohs: An introduction (3rd ed.). Oxford: Oxford University press. ISBN 978-0195002676.
- Grimal, Nicolas (1992). A History of Ancient Egypt (PDF). Oxford: Blackwell Books. p. 512. ISBN 9780631174721.
- Lloyd, Alan B. (1994). "Egypt, 404–322 B.C.". In Lewis, D.M.; Boardman, John; Hornblower, Simon; et al. (eds.). The Cambridge Ancient History (2nd ed.), vol. VI – The Fourth Century B.C. Cambridge University Press. pp. 337–360. ISBN 0-521-23348-8.
- Ray, John D. (1986). "Psammuthis and Hakoris". The Journal of Egyptian Archaeology. 72: 149–158. doi:10.1177/030751338607200112. S2CID 192348366.
- Wilkinson, Toby (2010). The Rise and Fall of Ancient Egypt. London: Bloomsbury. p. 672. ISBN 978-1-4088-10026.

Hakor 29th Dynasty Born: ? Died: 379/8 BCE
Preceded by Nepherites I	Pharaoh of Egypt; 392/1–391/0 BCE	Succeeded by Psammuthes
Preceded by Psammuthes	Pharaoh of Egypt; 390/89–379/8 BCE	Succeeded by Nepherites II
