= Nepherites I =

Egyptian pharaoh from 399 BC to 393 BC

- Nefaarud I, Nayfaurud I
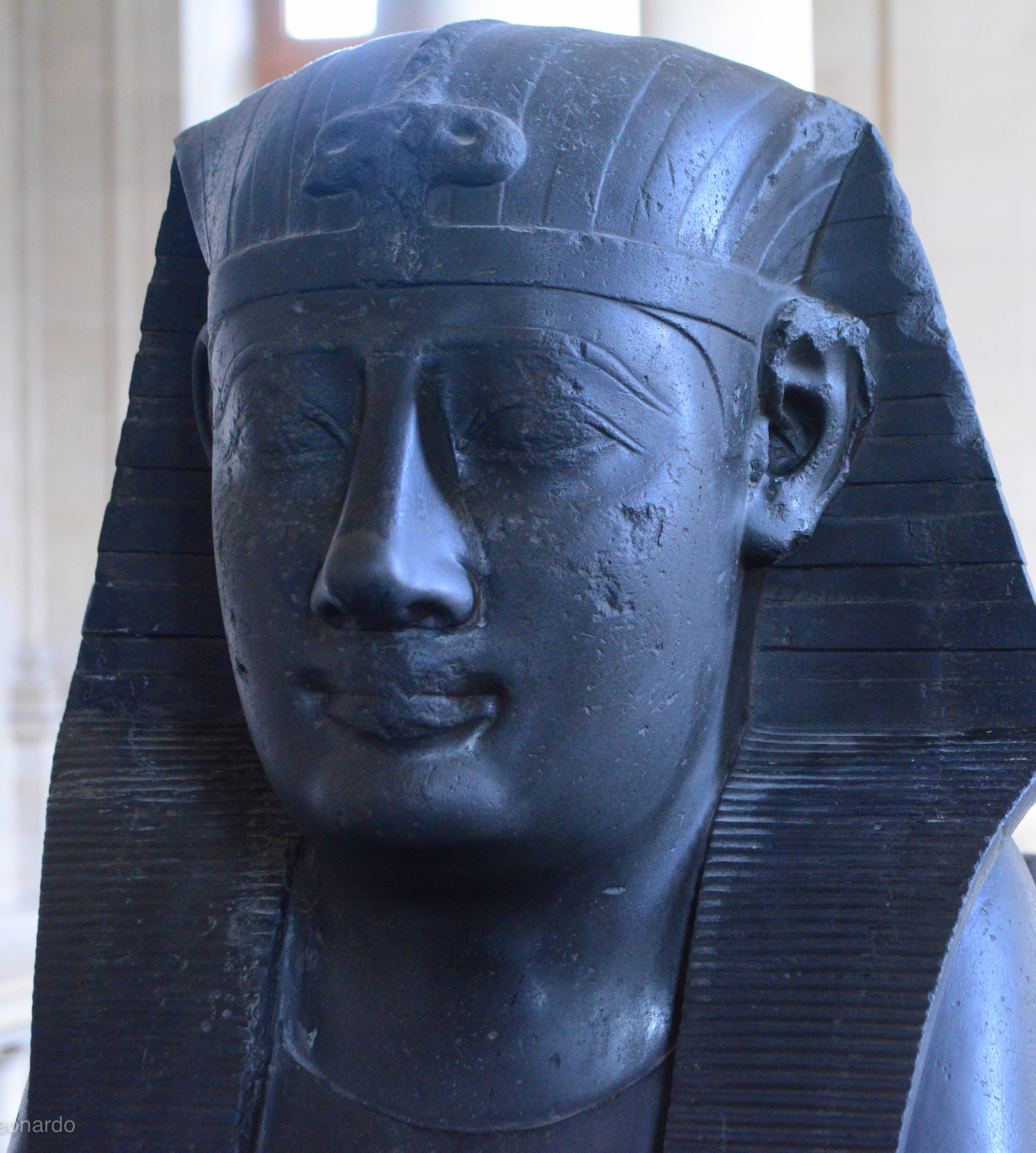
- Statue claimed to be the Sphinx of pharaoh Nepherites I, found in 1513 and purchased in 1808 in Italy. Louvre museum, A 26

Pharaoh
- Reign: 399–393 BC
- Predecessor: Amyrtaeus
- Successor: Hakor
Royal titulary
Horus name
Aa-ib
Of Great Mind
G5	O29V F34
Golden Horus
Setep-netjeru
Chosen by the gods
G8	U21 R8A
Prenomen
Ba-en-re Mery-netjeru
Soul of Re, Beloved of the Gods

M23 X1 L2 X1	N5 E10 N35 R8A N36
Nomen
Nef-aa-rud
The Great Ones prosper

G39 N5	N35 G1s Z4 f O29 Z7 Z2ss T12
- Children: Hakor
- Died: 393 BC
- Burial: Mendes?
- Dynasty: 29th Dynasty

Nefaarud I or Nayfaurud I, better known with his hellenised name Nepherites I, was an ancient Egyptian pharaoh, the founder of the 29th Dynasty in 399 BC.

== Reign ==
=== Accession ===
It is believed that Nepherites was a general from the deltaic city of Mendes who, in the autumn of 399 BC, rose against pharaoh Amyrtaeus, defeated him in open battle, and then executed him at Memphis. Nepherites then crowned himself pharaoh at Memphis and possibly also at Sais, before shifting the capital from Sais to his hometown Mendes. The fact that Nepherites I chose the same Horus name of Psamtik I and the Golden Horus name of Amasis II – both relevant rulers of the earlier 26th Dynasty – is thought to demonstrate that he wanted to associate his rule with an earlier 'golden age' of Egyptian history.

=== Activities ===
According to Manetho, Nepherites I ruled for six years, although his highest archaeologically attested date is his regnal year 4.

Evidence of Nepherites' building work has been found in a number of locations across the country. In Lower Egypt, he is attested at Thmuis, Buto (where a statue of him has been found), Memphis, Saqqara (where an Apis burial took place in his regnal year 2) and his capital and hometown Mendes. In Middle and Upper Egypt, he ordered a chapel at Akoris while at Akhmim, near Sohag, there is evidence of the worship of a statue of him which was placed inside a naos. He also added some buildings at Karnak such as a storeroom and a shrine meant to house a sacred bark. A basalt sphinx with his name is now located in the Louvre, but it was known to have been brought to Europe as early as the 16th century, having adorned a fountain at the Villa Borghese gardens, Rome.

In foreign affairs, he resumed the policy of Egyptian intervention in the Middle East. As reported by Diodorus Siculus, in 396 BC he supported the Spartan king Agesilaus in his war against the Persians; the Spartans had conquered Cyprus and Rhodes and were attempting to extend their influence further east. Nepherites supplied the Spartans with 500,000 measures of grain and material for 100 triremes. However, the cargo reached Rhodes just after the Persians managed to retake the island, so it was entirely seized by the philo-Persian admiral Conon of Athens.

=== Death and succession ===
Nepherites I died during the winter of 394/393 BC after a six-year reign. The Demotic Chronicle simply states that "his son" was allowed to succeed him, without providing any name. Nowadays it is generally believed that Nepherites' son was Hakor, who ruled after him for only a year before being overthrown by an apparently unrelated claimant, Psammuthes; Hakor, however, was able to retake the throne the following year.

== Possible tomb ==
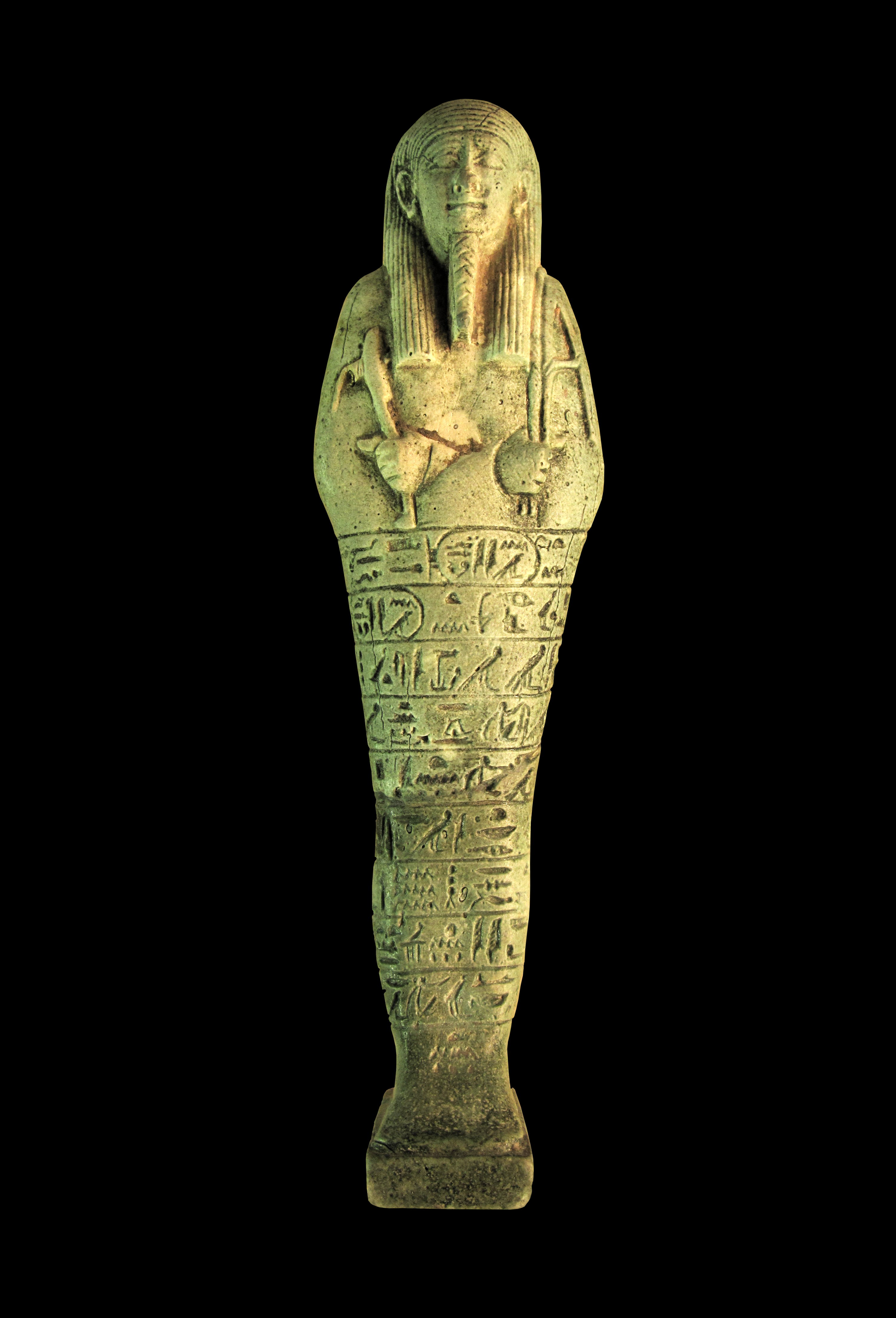
A shabti of Nepherites I found in the tomb

A tomb believed to be that of Nepherites was discovered in Mendes by a joint team from the University of Toronto and the University of Washington in 1992–93. Possible ownership of the tomb was identified by the presence of a shabti bearing the name of Nepherites I; however, definitive proof has not been found. Although still containing funerary objects and a large limestone sarcophagus, the tomb was believed to have been robbed and destroyed by the Persians in 343 BC. Ceramic vessels containing fish specimens and fish-covered stelae have been found on the site of Nepherites's funerary complex. The presence of the fish, often interpreted as votive offerings, could be an indication that the site was previously occupied by a temple of the fish-goddess Hatmehyt.

== See also ==
- Muthis – A conjectural pharaoh, once believed to be Nepherites I's son.

Nepherites I 29th Dynasty Born: ? Died: 393 BC
Preceded by Amyrtaeus	Pharaoh of Egypt; 399–393 BC	Succeeded by Hakor
