= Demotic Chronicle =

Ancient Egyptian prophetic text

The Demotic Chronicle is an ancient Egyptian prophetic text. The work is intended to provide a chronicle of the 28th, 29th and 30th dynasties – thus the independence interval between the two Persian dominations. Rather than providing historical events occurred during the reigns of the pharaohs of the aforementioned period, the Demotic Chronicle judges these rulers on the basis of their behaviour, explaining the length and prosperity of their reigns as an expression of divine will. The Chronicle also emphasizes the misrule of the "Medes" (i.e. the Achaemenids) and of the Ptolemies, and prophesies the coming of a native hero who will ascend to the throne and restore an era of order and justice upon Egypt.

The anti-Achaemenid themes within the Demotic Chronicle especially focus on Cambyses II, Xerxes I and Artaxerxes III.

The manuscript consists in a papyrus written in demotic; hence, its name. It was found during the Napoleonic campaign in Egypt and now stored at the Bibliothèque nationale de France (Pap. 215). The work claims to date back to the time of pharaoh Teos of the 30th Dynasty, although in fact it is a later work datable to the 3rd century BCE, likely composed under the reign of Ptolemy III Euergetes.

Despite its cryptic text, analysis of the Demotic Chronicle has allowed, among other things, integration of the order of succession of the treated pharaohs with the informations provided by Manetho's epitomes.

== See also ==
- Darius the Great's Suez Inscriptions
- Oracle of the Lamb
- Oracle of the Potter
