= Twenty-ninth Dynasty of Egypt =

398–380 BC ancient Egyptian dynasty

- 398 BC–380 BC
- The Near East in 400 BC
- Capital: Mendes
- Common languages: Egyptian
- Religion: Ancient Egyptian religion
- Government: Absolute monarchy
- Historical era: Classical antiquity
  - Deposition of Amyrtaeus: 398 BC
  - Deposition of Nefaarud II: 380 BC
Preceded by	Succeeded by
Twenty-eighth Dynasty of Egypt	Thirtieth Dynasty of Egypt

The Twenty-ninth Dynasty of Egypt (notated Dynasty XXIX, alternatively 29th Dynasty or Dynasty 29) is usually classified as the fourth Dynasty of the Ancient Egyptian Late Period. It was founded after the overthrow of Amyrtaeus, the only Pharaoh of the 28th Dynasty, by Nefaarud I in 398 BC, and disestablished upon the overthrow of Nefaarud II in 380 BC.

== History ==
Nefaarud I founded the 29th Dynasty (according to an account preserved in a papyrus in the Brooklyn Museum) by defeating Amyrtaeus in open battle, and later putting him to death at Memphis. Nefaarud then made Mendes his capital.

On Nefaarud's death, two rival factions fought for the throne: one behind his son Muthis, and the other supporting a usurper Psammuthes; although Psammuthes was successful, he only managed to reign for a year.

Psammuthes was overthrown by Hakor, who claimed to be the grandson of Nefaarud I. He successfully resisted Persian attempts to reconquer Egypt, drawing support from Athens (until the Peace of Antalcidas in 387 BC), and from the rebel king of Cyprus, Evagoras. Although his son Nefaarud II became king on his death, the younger Nefaarud was unable to keep hold of his inheritance.

== Pharaohs of the 29th Dynasty ==
Name of Pharaoh	Image	Reign	Prenomen (Throne name)	Horus-name	Comments
Nefaarud I		398–393 BC	Baenre	Aaib	Defeated Amyrtaeus in open battle and had him executed
Psammuthes		393 BC	Userra-setepenptah	Aapehtymarsepu	Reigned for only a year. Overthrown by Hakor.
Hakor (Achoris)		393–380BC	Khnummaatre	Aaibmerytawy	Overthrew his predecessor Psammuthes. Father of Nefaarud II.
Nefaarud II		380 BC	(unknown)	(unknown)	Was deposed and likely killed by Nectanebo I after ruling for only 4 months.

== Timeline of the 29th Dynasty ==
Preceded by Twenty-eighth Dynasty	Dynasties of Egypt c. 398 BC–380 BC	Succeeded by Thirtieth Dynasty
