= I Modi =

Book with engravings of sexual scenes that was created in around 1524

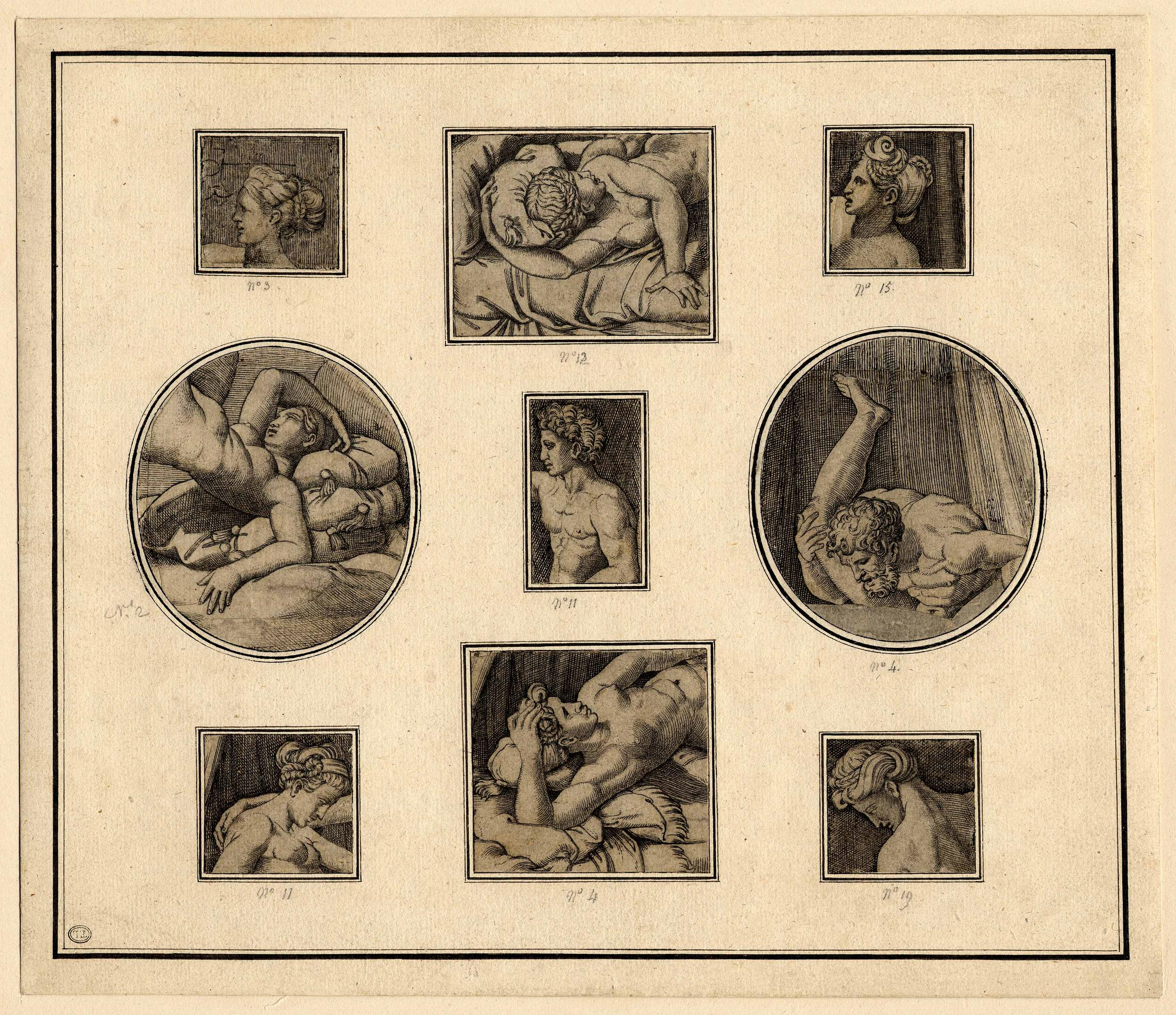
These nine fragments cut from seven engravings are thought to be by Agostino Veneziano. They are thought to come from a replacement set of engravings created for the images that were in I modi. Paper. British Museum, London. Around 1530.

I Modi (The Ways), also known as The Sixteen Pleasures or under the Latin title De omnibus Veneris Schematibus, is a famous erotic book of the Italian Renaissance that had engravings of sexual scenes. The engravings were created in a collaboration between Giulio Romano and Marcantonio Raimondi. They were thought to have been created around 1524 to 1527.

There are now no known copies of the first two editions of I modi. In around 1530 Agostino Veneziano is thought to have created a replacement set of engravings for the originals.

== Giulio Romano and Marcantonio Raimondi edition (around 1524–1527) ==
The first edition of I Modi was created in a collaboration between Giulio Romano and Marcantonio Raimondi.

One idea that is speculated is that Giulio drew the figures while Marcantonio designed the settings.

Another idea is that this collaboration occurred when Giulio Romano was doing a series of erotic paintings as a commission for Federico II Gonzaga’s new Palazzo Te in Mantua and Marcantonio Raimondi based the engravings for I modi on these paintings.

It has also been speculated that the images in I modi may have been inspired by Ancient Roman spintria tokens and it is speculated that Giulio Romano may have seen spintria tokens. It is also speculated erotic Ancient Roman sculptures and reliefs may have influenced images in I modi. A relief on the outside of an Ancient Roman sarcophagus shows a female Satyr guiding the erect penis of a Herm sculpture towards her vagina and it has been commented that the postures of the female Satyr and the herm have similarities to the figures in image 7 of the woodcut booklet.

The engravings were published by Marcantonio in 1524, and led to his imprisonment by Pope Clement VII and the destruction of all copies of the engravings.

Giulio Romano did not become aware of the engravings by Marcantonio until the poet Pietro Aretino came to see his paintings. These are the paintings that Marcantonio is thought to have based his engravings on and Romano was still working on these paintings when Aretino came to visit. Romano was not prosecuted since—unlike Marcantonio—his images were not intended for public consumption, and he was not in the Papal States.

Aretino then composed sixteen explicit sonnets to accompany the engravings, and secured Marcantonio's release from prison.

I modi was then published a second time in 1527, now with the sonnets that have given them the traditional English title Aretino's Postures. It is thought that this is the first time erotic text and images were combined, though the papacy once more seized all the copies it could find. It is thought Marcantonio escaped prison on this second occasion, but the suppression on both occasions was comprehensive.

There are presently no remaining copies of the first or second edition of I modi. The images that were in these two editions of I modi are thought to have been copied several times.

== Agostino Veneziano copy (around 1530) ==
It is thought that Agostino Veneziano may have created a single replacement set of engravings for the images created by Giulio and Marcantonio in I modi. There is one whole image as well as nine fragments cut from seven engravings that are in the British Museum, and it is thought that all of these images come from this replacement set of engravings by Agostino. These engravings by Agostino are dated to around 1530.

There is an engraving of Leda and the Swan in the British Museum that is thought to be by Agostino Veneziano, and it is thought to have been created in around 1524 to 1527. It is speculated that this engraving has been based on an engraving from I modi by Giulio and Marcantonio. The engraving is the same size and format as the I modi engravings, and it is speculated that it may be based on a design by Giulio Romano.

It is thought that as well as Agostino Veneziano there were other people who contributed to the creation of this replacement set of engravings.

== Copies of the Agostino Veneziano copy of I modi ==
Woodcut booklet copy (around 1555)

A possibly infringing copy of I modi with crude illustrations created using woodcut relief printing is thought to copy the images of I modi that were in the Agostino Veneziano replacement copy of the work.

It is speculated that this woodcut booklet was created around 1555. The artist who created the woodcut images in the booklet is unknown. The booklet was discovered in the 1920s.

It is thought that this woodcut booklet is "…several generations removed from the original engravings…" of Marcantonio. It is thought that these generations of I modi copies have been based on the Agostino Veneziano edition of I modi.

It has been speculated that this woodcut booklet from around 1555 may have been copied from a second woodcut copy of I modi that is speculated to have been created around 1540.

It is thought the woodblocks that were used to print the woodcut booklet may have been reused multiple times. The images have borders that were frequently broken indicating wear and breakage in the woodblocks.

One of the leaves is missing from this woodcut booklet and there were two I modi-related images on this leaf.

This woodcut booklet shows that there were more images in Giulio and Marcantonio's edition of I modi than is shown by the nine remaining fragments and the one whole image that are thought to be by Agostino Veneziano.

It has been described that for this woodcut booklet there are two images "…in the abbreviated final signature…[that] seem to come from different traditions." For one of these two images it has been commented that "…both image and text differ markedly in style from those that precede them…" in the woodcut booklet.

When the images in the woodcut booklet are compared to the engravings thought to be by Agostino it is thought they have been changed to suit the woodcut medium, with the images being square and reduced in size.

Engraving in the Albertina museum (16th century)

There is one engraving in the Albertina museum that is thought to have been copied from Agostino Veneziano's edition of I modi. It matches an oval fragment in the British Museum and the 11th image in the woodcut booklet.

It is thought that this single engraving comes from a set of engravings and only this one engraving presently remains from this set.

It is dated to the 16th century, and the artist is unknown. It is numbered in the bottom right corner with two.

Francesco Xanto Avelli maiolica dishes

It is thought that between 1531 and 1535 Francesco Xanto Avelli saw Agostino Veneziano's copy of I modi. Xanto painted a maiolica dish titled The Tiber in Flood, and the figures on this dish have the same postures as those in images numbered 1, 3, 8 and 14 in the woodcut booklet. The dish also includes a herm sculpture that copies a herm that can be seen in image 1 of the woodcut booklet.

Xanto painted a second maiolica dish titled Narcissus (The vain lover of his own image). The figure of Narcissus on this maiolica plate has been copied from the third woodcut copy image of I modi.

Parmigianino drawing

Parmigianino drew a copy of one of the engravings in I modi with sex occurring between two figures who are seated. This drawing is similar to the 10th image in the woodcut booklet. It includes similar postures of the figures and details of drapery and furniture. A second drawing by Parmigianino has similarities to the 10th image in the woodcut booklet.

Engravings in the National Library of Spain

There is an engraving in the National Library of Spain that copies one scene from I modi. The engraving shows two figures seated having sex with a wooden cradle lying on the ground next to them, and the foot of one of the figures is rocking the cradle. This engraving is not present in the woodcut booklet and does not correspond to any of the fragments thought to be by Agostino Veneziano that are in the British Museum.

A second engraving in the National Library of Spain has been copied from the one whole engraving that is thought to be by Agostino Veneziano and that corresponds to image one in the woodcut booklet. This second engraving has been created in reverse when compared to the image thought to be by Agostino.

Both of these two images in the National Library of Spain are by an unknown artist and dated to after 1530. They are also both "…uniform in engraving style, paper and ink…".

Sepia drawings by Johan Tobias Sergel

A sepia drawing by Johan Tobias Sergel (1740–1814) possibly copies one scene from I Modi. The scene that it copies is the scene that is shown on an engraving in the National Library of Spain of sex between two seated figures.

A second sepia drawing by Johan Tobias Sergel has some similarities to this image in the National Library of Spain.

"The French Arétin by a member of the Academy of Ladies" - François-Félix Nogaret, Francois-Rolland Elluin, Antoine Borel - (1787)

In 1787 a book of sonnets and engravings of sexual scenes was published under the title "L'Aretin françois," by a member of the Academy of Ladies. The sonnets were written by François-Félix Nogaret and the engravings were created by Francois-Rolland Elluin based on drawings by Antoine Borel. It is thought to have been published in Reims or Paris and is in the collection of the National Library of France.

It is commented in the book that; "Do not expect to find here a literal translation of the Sonnets of Aretino.... ...The Poet only applied himself to rendering the various subjects of the Designer..."

These same sonnets by François-Félix Nogaret were published again in a book in 1869 under the same title. It is also commented in this book from 1869 that the poems in this book have been translated from the sonnets of Pietro Aretino.

In a foreword to the book published in 1869 it is commented that "L'Arétin français, followed by Les Epices de Vénus, first appeared in 1787, then in 1788, then in 1803, 1829, 1830 and 1869".

In this book from 1869 there are a total of eighteen engravings. Seventeen of these eighteen engravings are copies of engravings that are in the book published in 1787.

For the book published in 1787 there are two images that have some similarities to two images from I modi. One image is similar to an engraving in the National Library of Spain showing sex between two people who are seated. The second image is similar to the 14th image in the woodcut booklet.

For the book published in 1869 there is also an image that is similar to the 14th image in the woodcut booklet.

Henry Wellesley engravings

Henry Wellesley owned two engravings that are now in the collection of the National Library of France, and both engravings are related to I modi images. One engraving was similar to the whole single image thought to be by Agostino in the British Museum and was numbered, and the other engraving was similar to the image in the Albertina museum and was numbered two.

Delaborde and Bartsch descriptions

Henri Delaborde and Adam Bartsch gave descriptions of images as belonging to I modi. The descriptions that they gave do not relate to any existing images and perhaps are examples of additional images that may have been in the original I modi.

== 17th-century printing ==
In the 17th century, Fellows of All Souls College, Oxford, engaged in the surreptitious printing at the University Press of Aretino's Postures, Aretino's De omnis Veneris schematibus and the indecent engravings after Giulio and Marcantonio. The Dean, Dr. John Fell, impounded the copper plates and threatened those involved with expulsion. The text of Aretino's sonnets, however, survives.

== Images from I modi copies ==
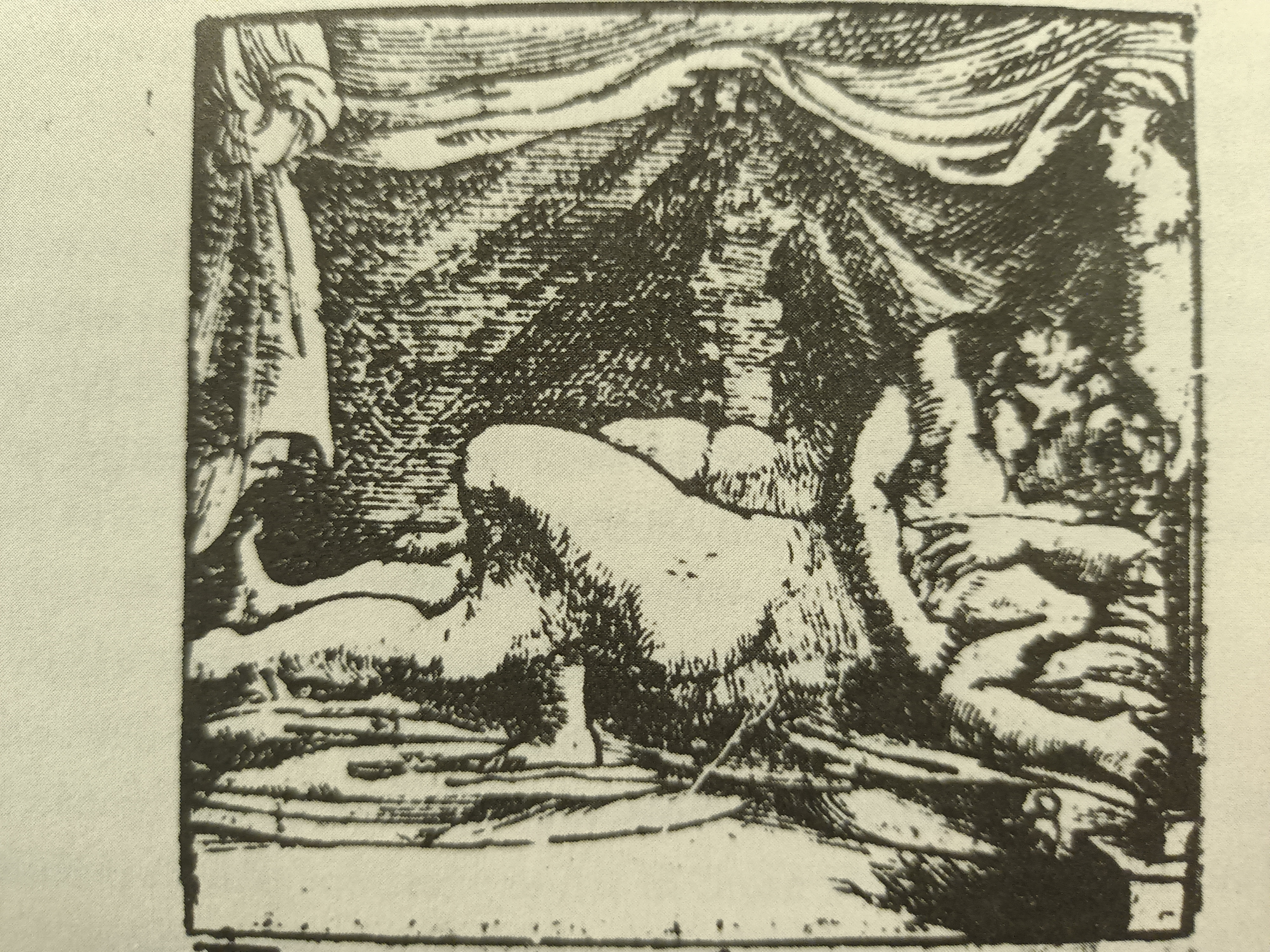
Image 1 woodcut booklet

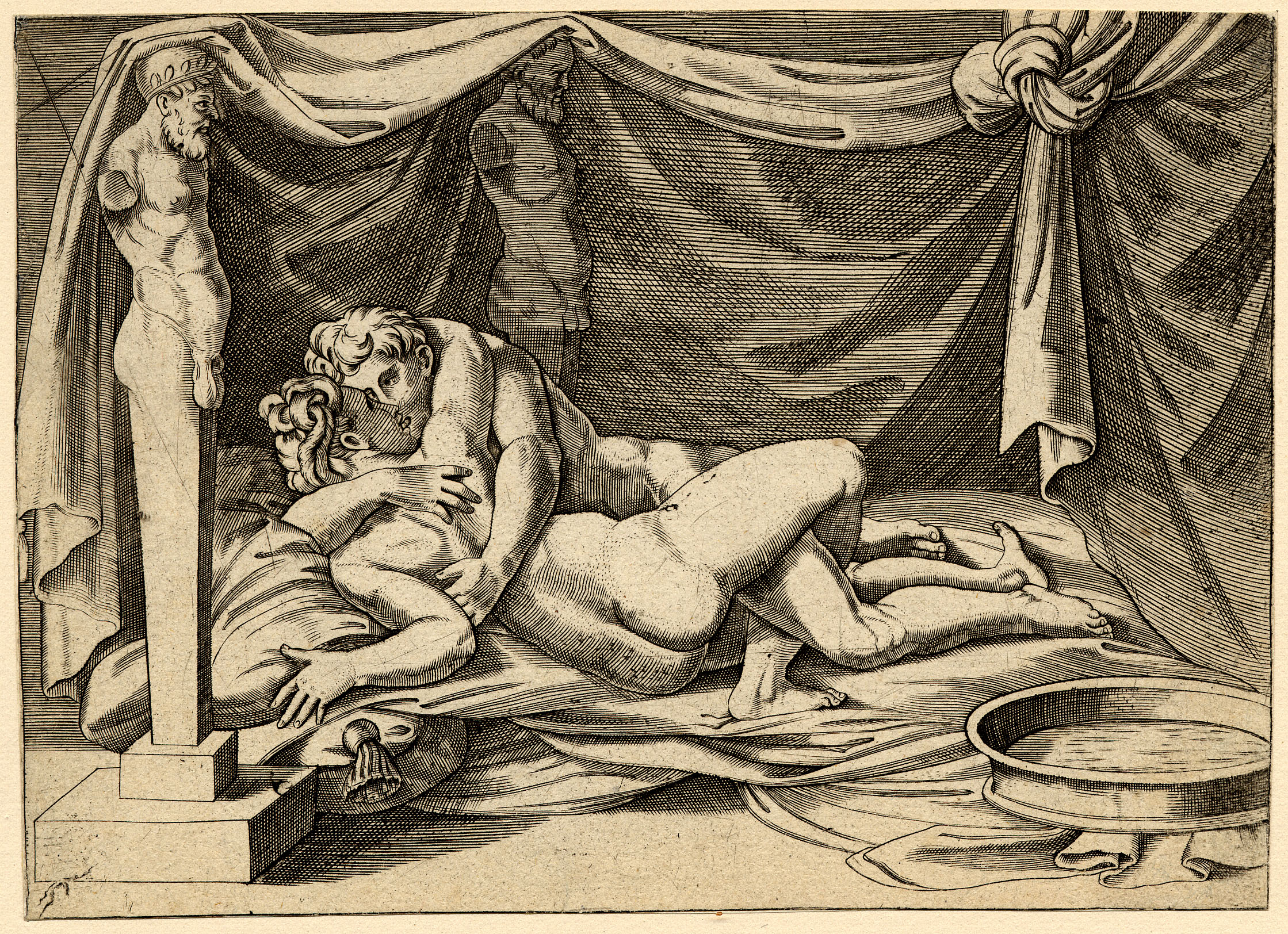
The corresponding image thought to be by Agostino Veneziano. Around 1530. British Museum
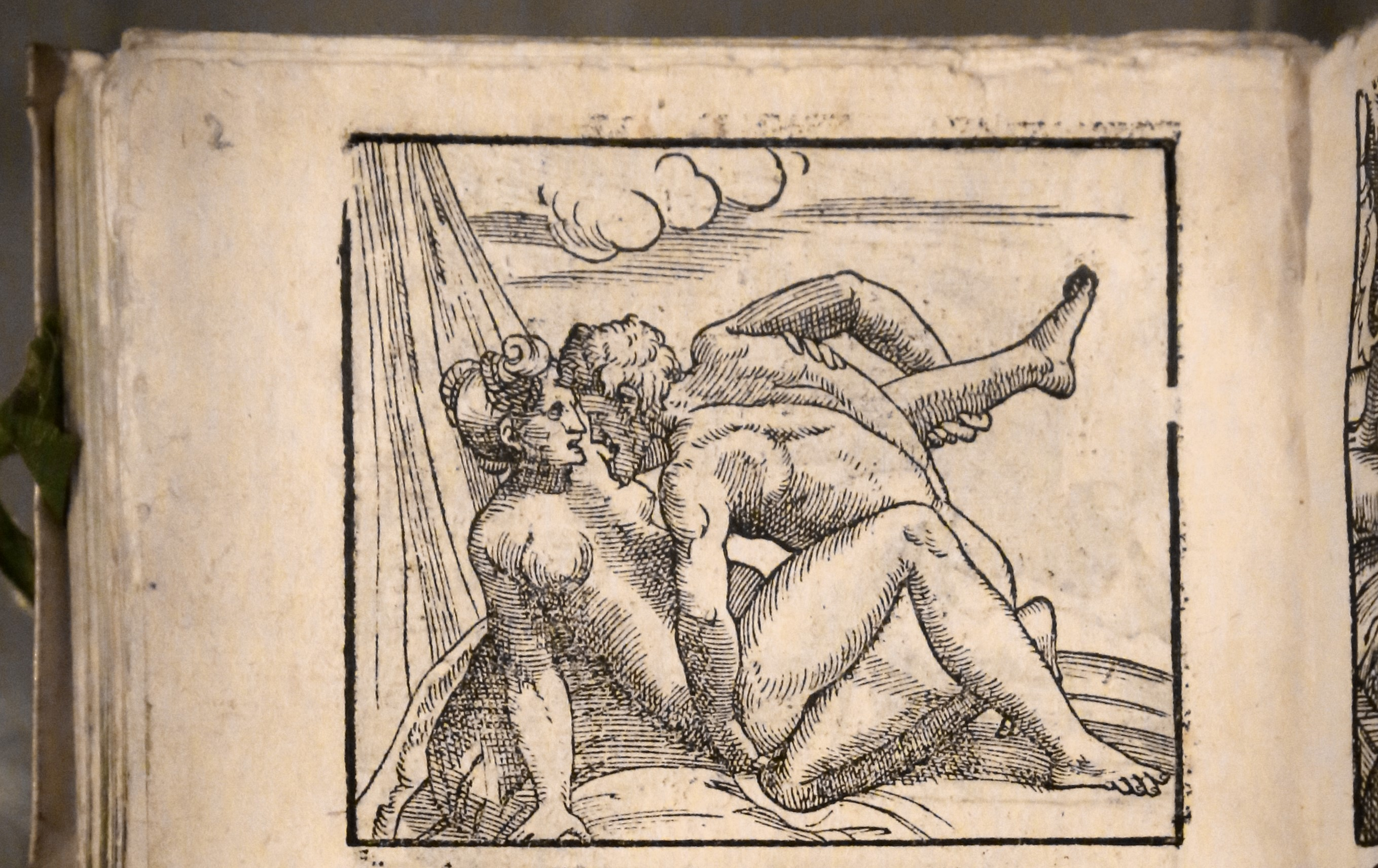
Image 2 woodcut booklet

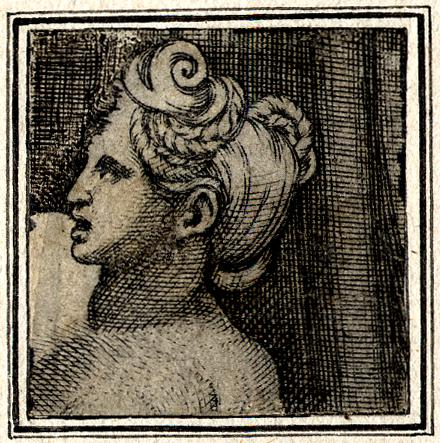
Corresponding fragment to image 2 thought to be by Agostino Veneziano. Around 1530.
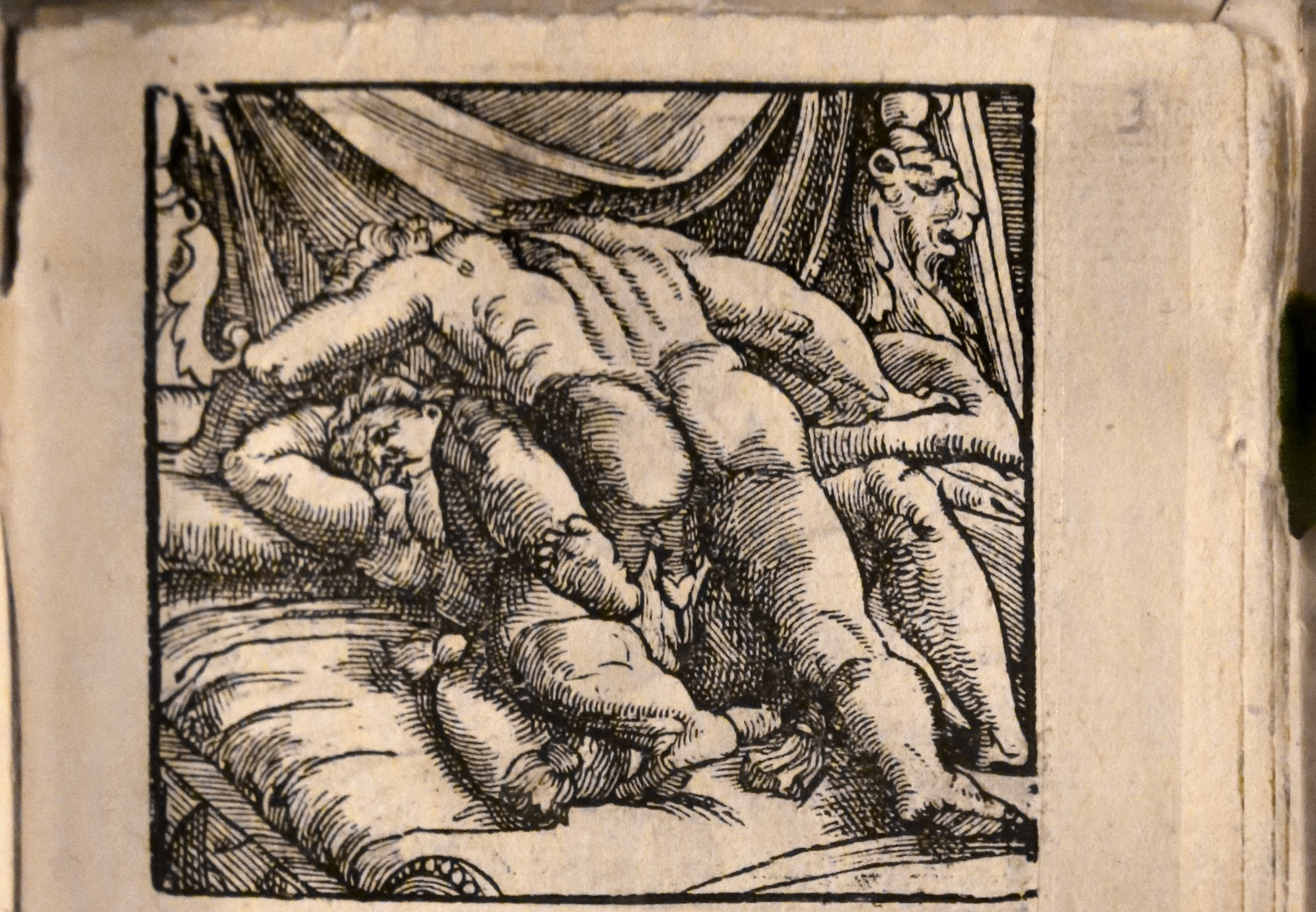
Image 3 woodcut booklet
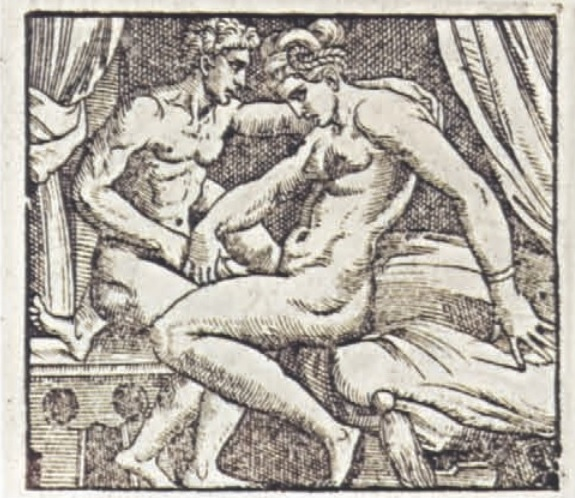
Image 4 woodcut booklet

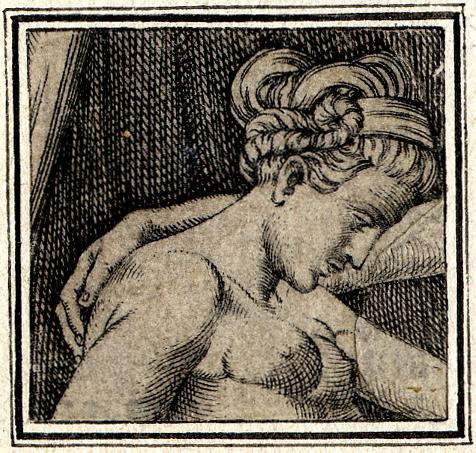
Corresponding fragment to image 4 thought to be by Agostino Veneziano. Two fragments cut from the one engraving. Around 1530.

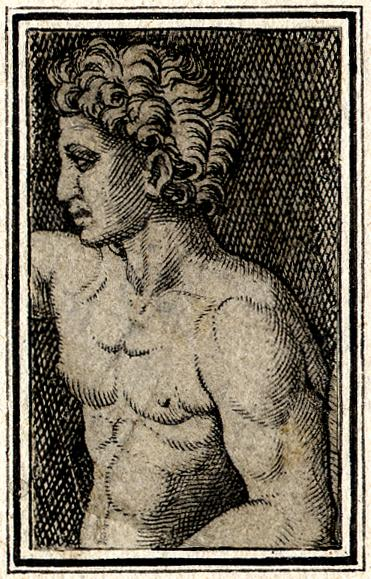
Corresponding fragment to image 4 thought to be by Agostino Veneziano. Around 1530.
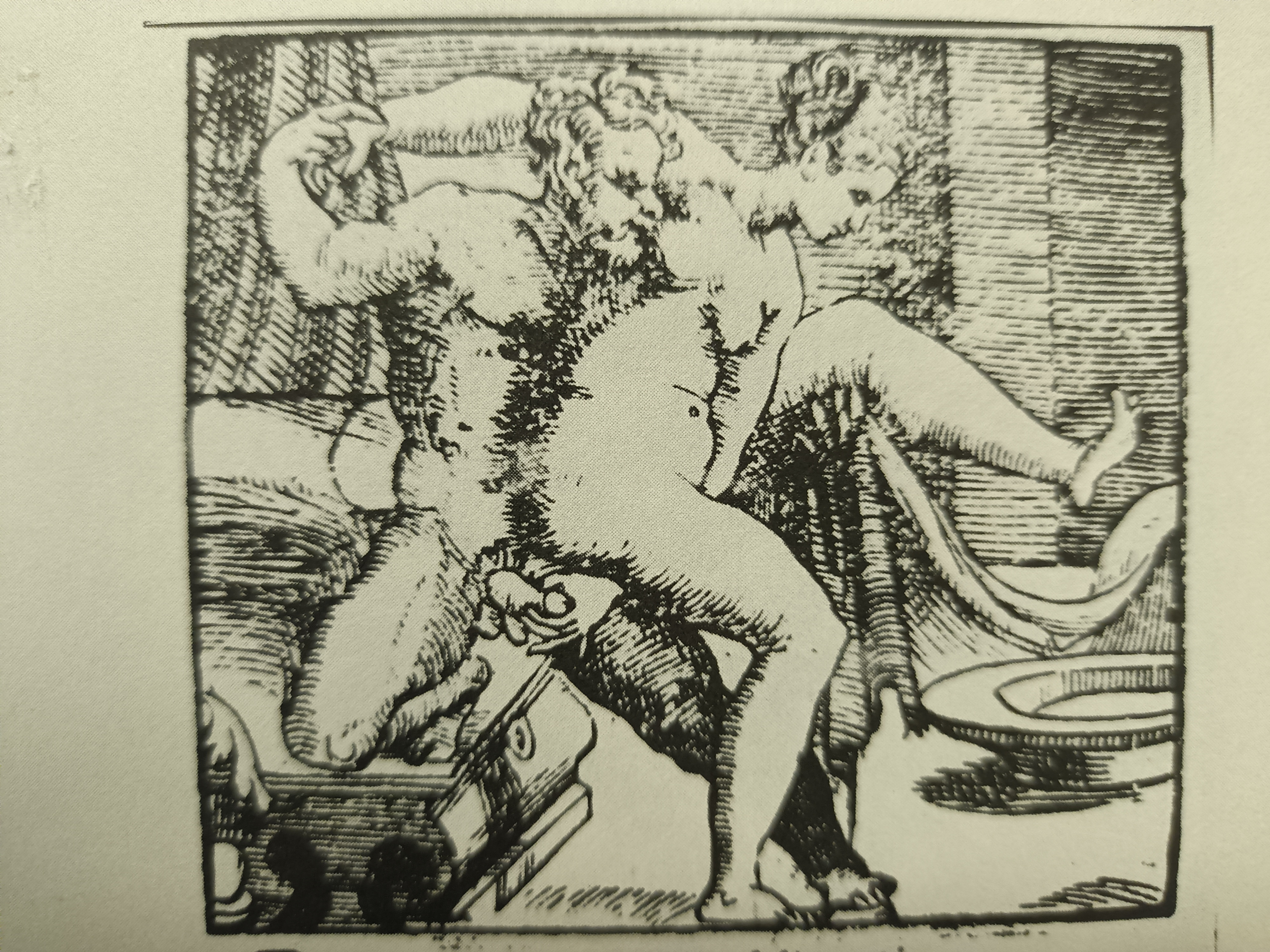
Image 7 woodcut booklet

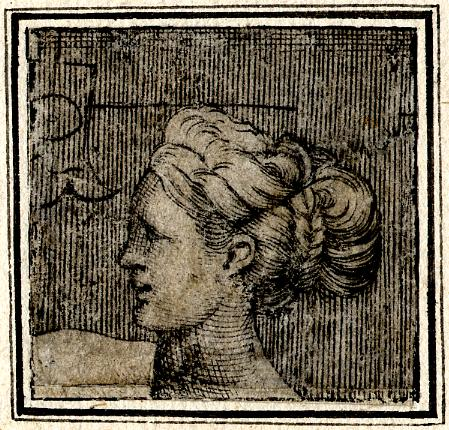
Corresponding fragment to image 7 thought to be by Agostino Veneziano. Around 1530.

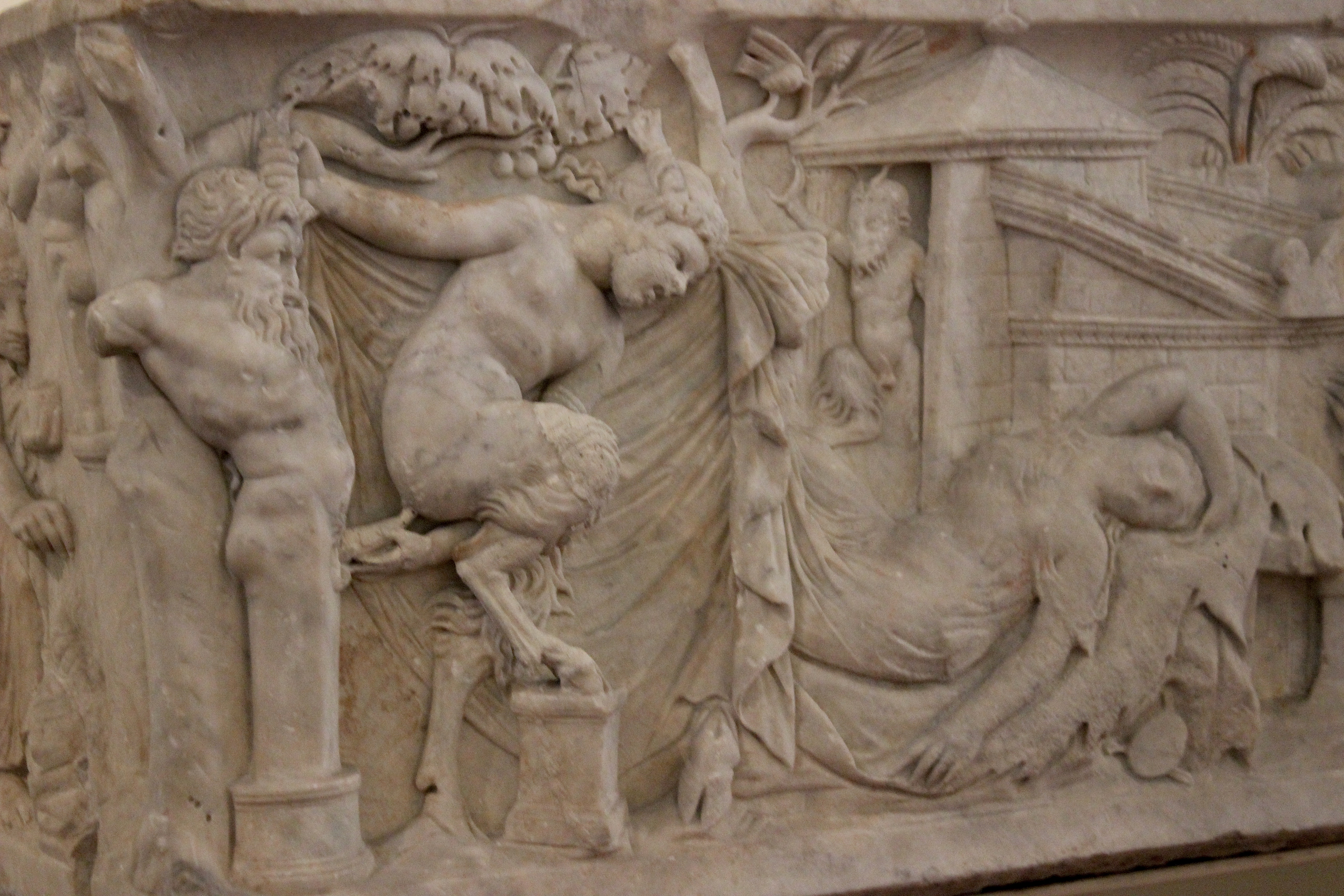
Detail of a relief on the outside of an ancient Roman sarcophagus. It has been commented that postures of the female Satyr and the herm sculpture have similarities to the figures in image 7 of the woodcut booklet. Marble. National Archaeological Museum, Naples. 140 to 160 CE.
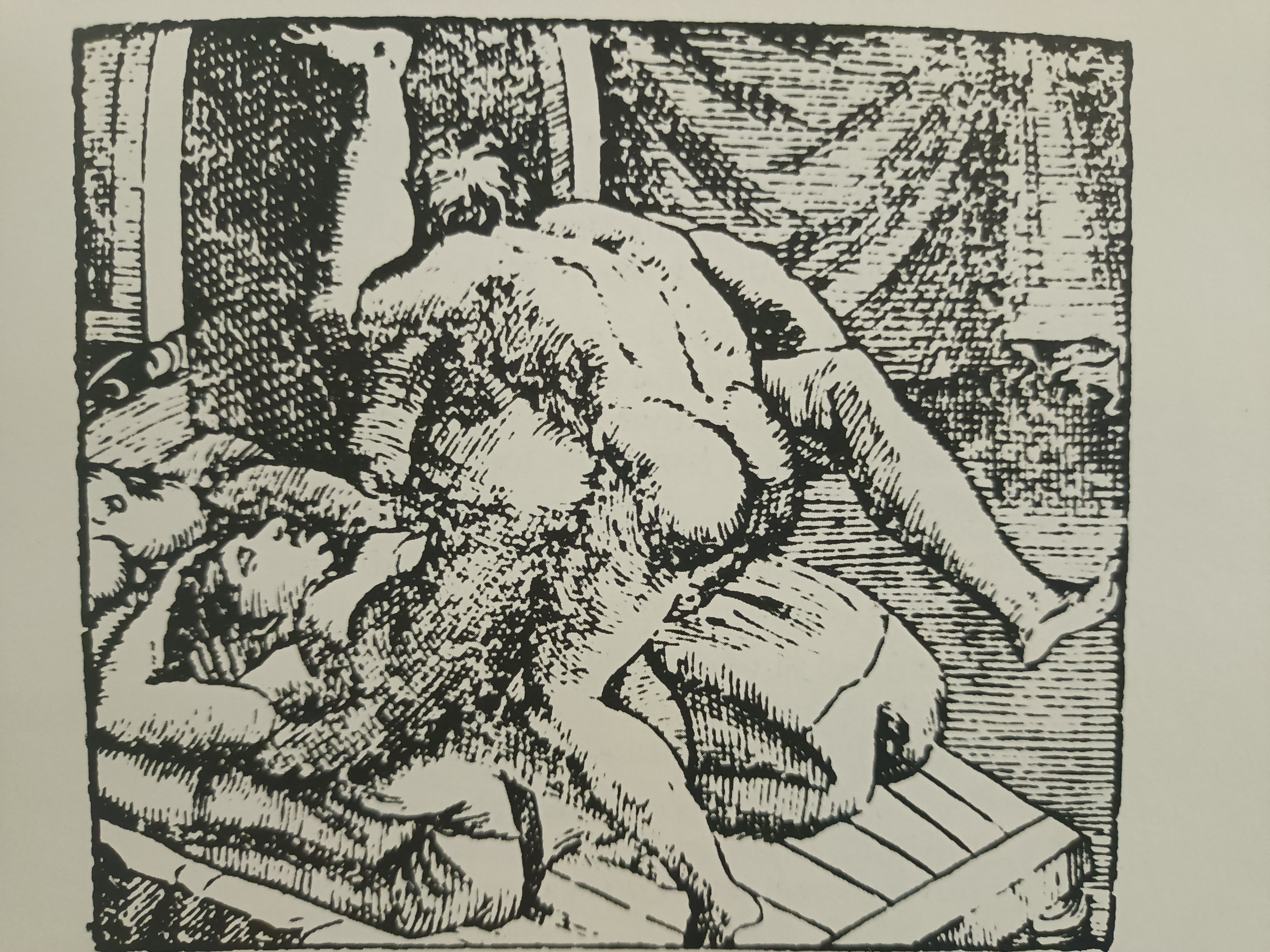
Image 8 woodcut booklet

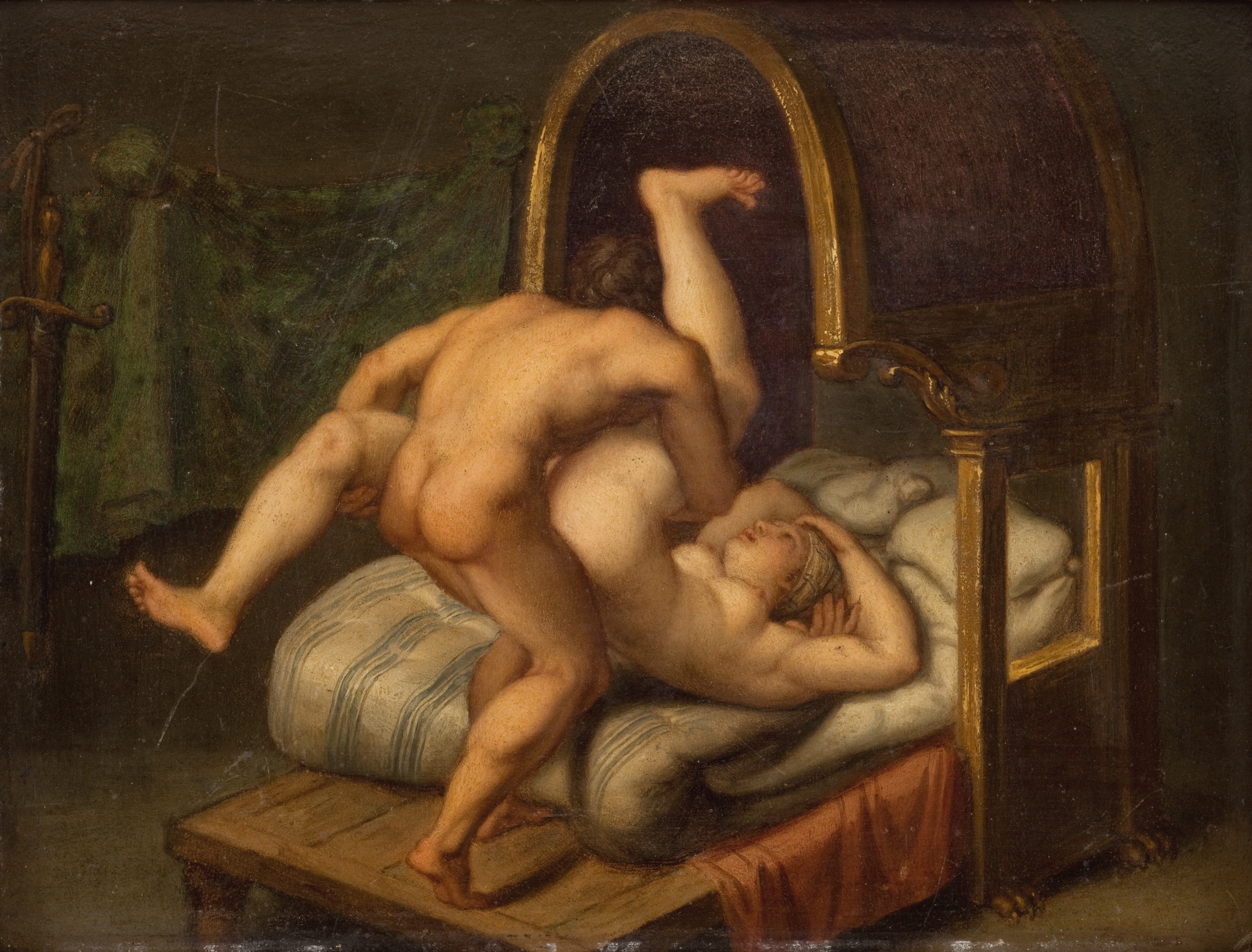
A painting by Agostino Carracci with similarities to posture 8. Oil on copper. 1572-1602. Statens Museum for Kunst, accession number KMS16a.
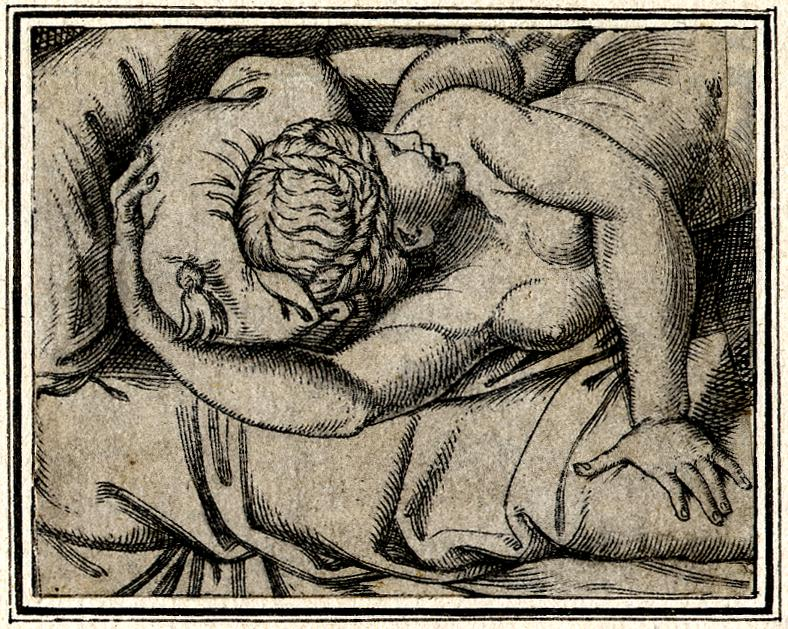
Corresponding fragment to image 9 thought to be by Agostino Veneziano. Around 1530.

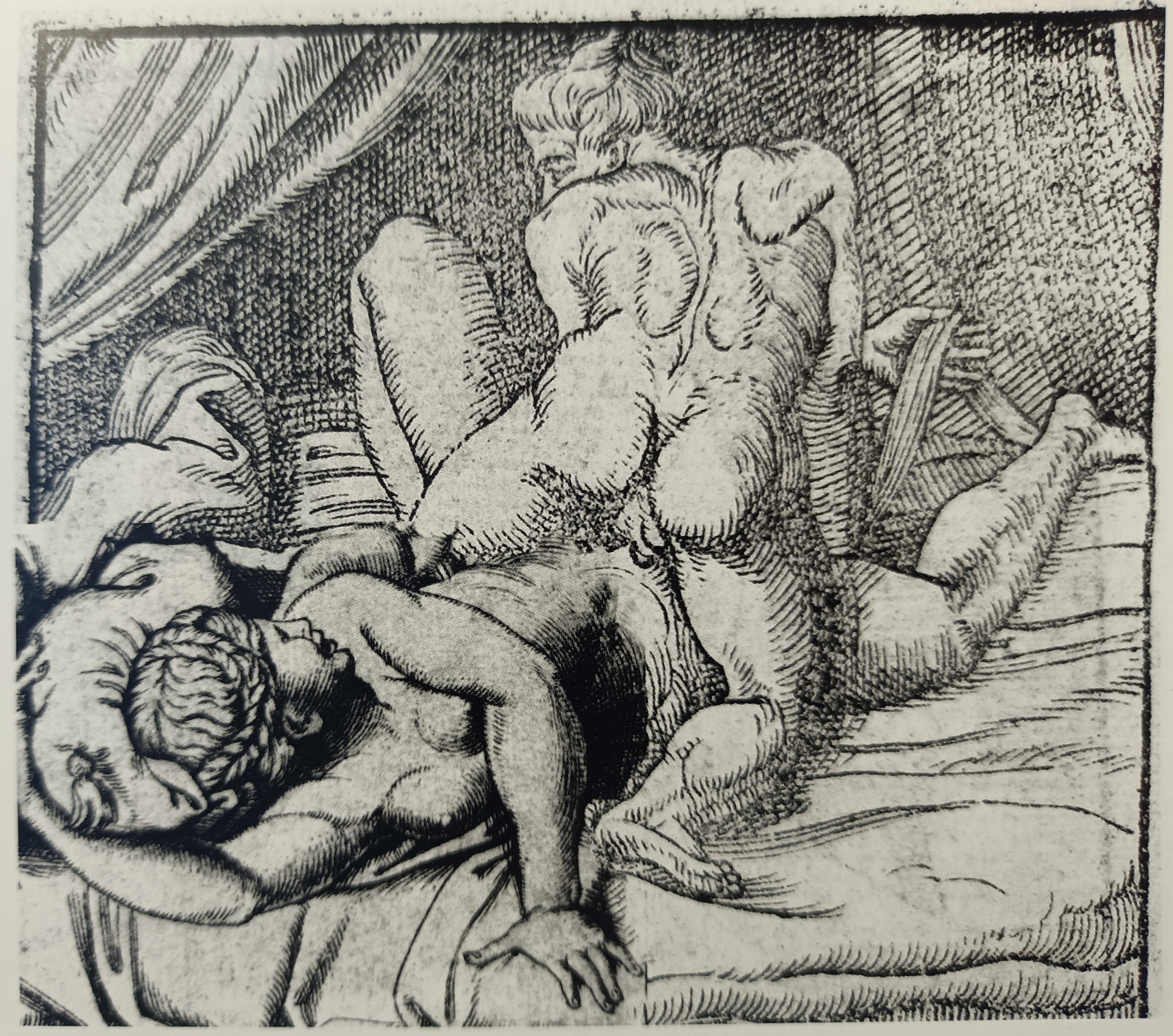
This image is made from two images. One is the image from the woodcut booklet. The second is the engraving thought to be by Agostino Veneziano.
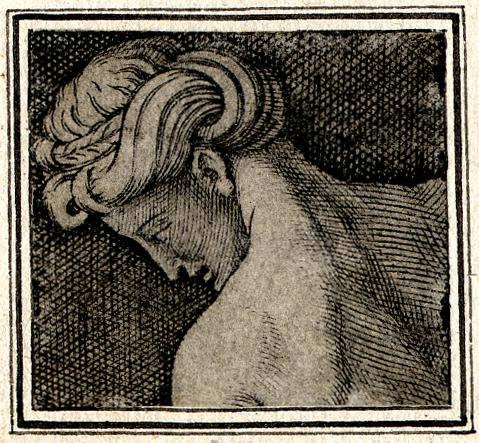
Corresponding fragment to image 10 thought to be by Agostino Veneziano. Around 1530.

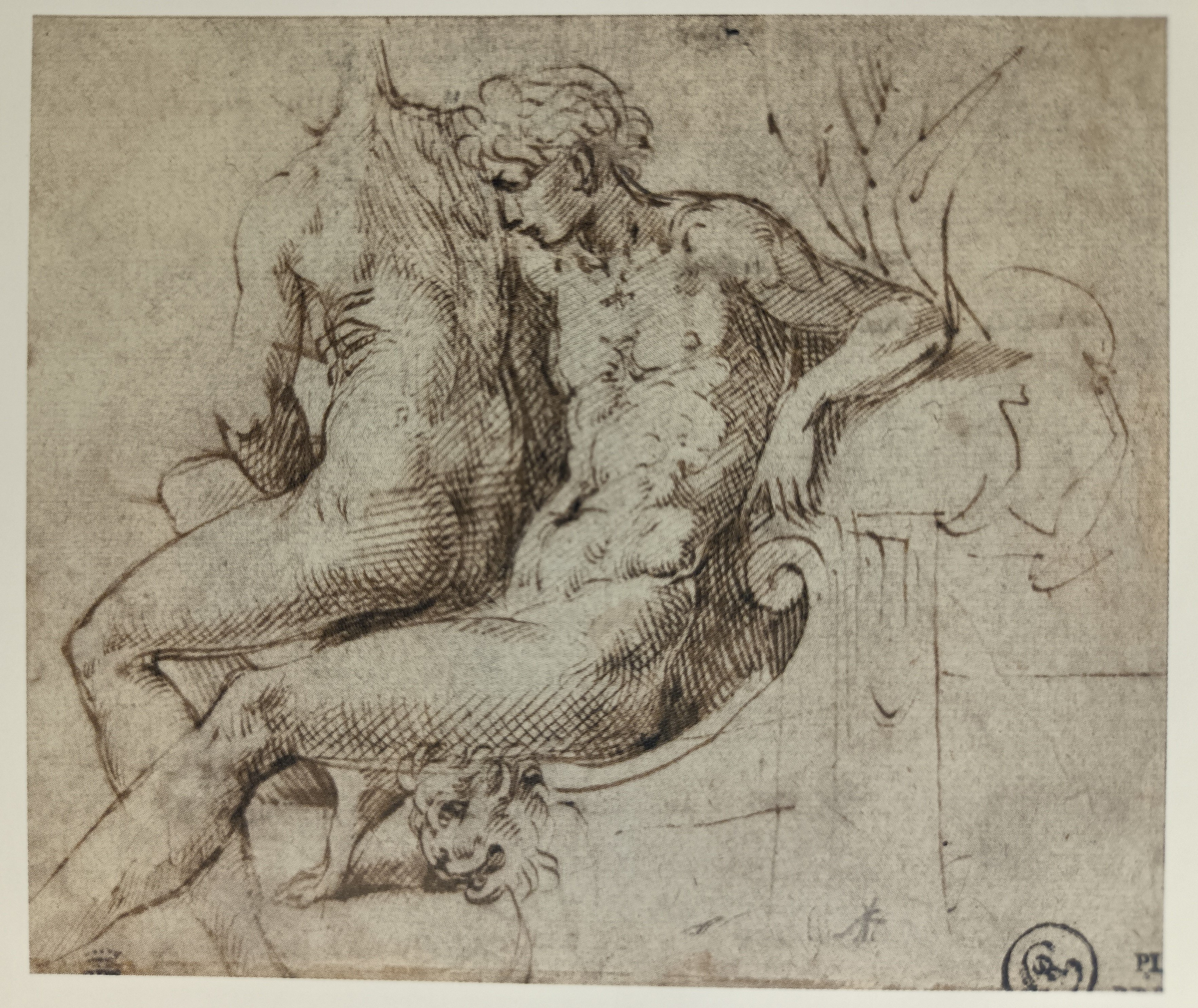
A drawing that copies image 10 in the woodcut booklet. Parmigianino. Pen and brown ink on paper, trimmed. 1524–1527.

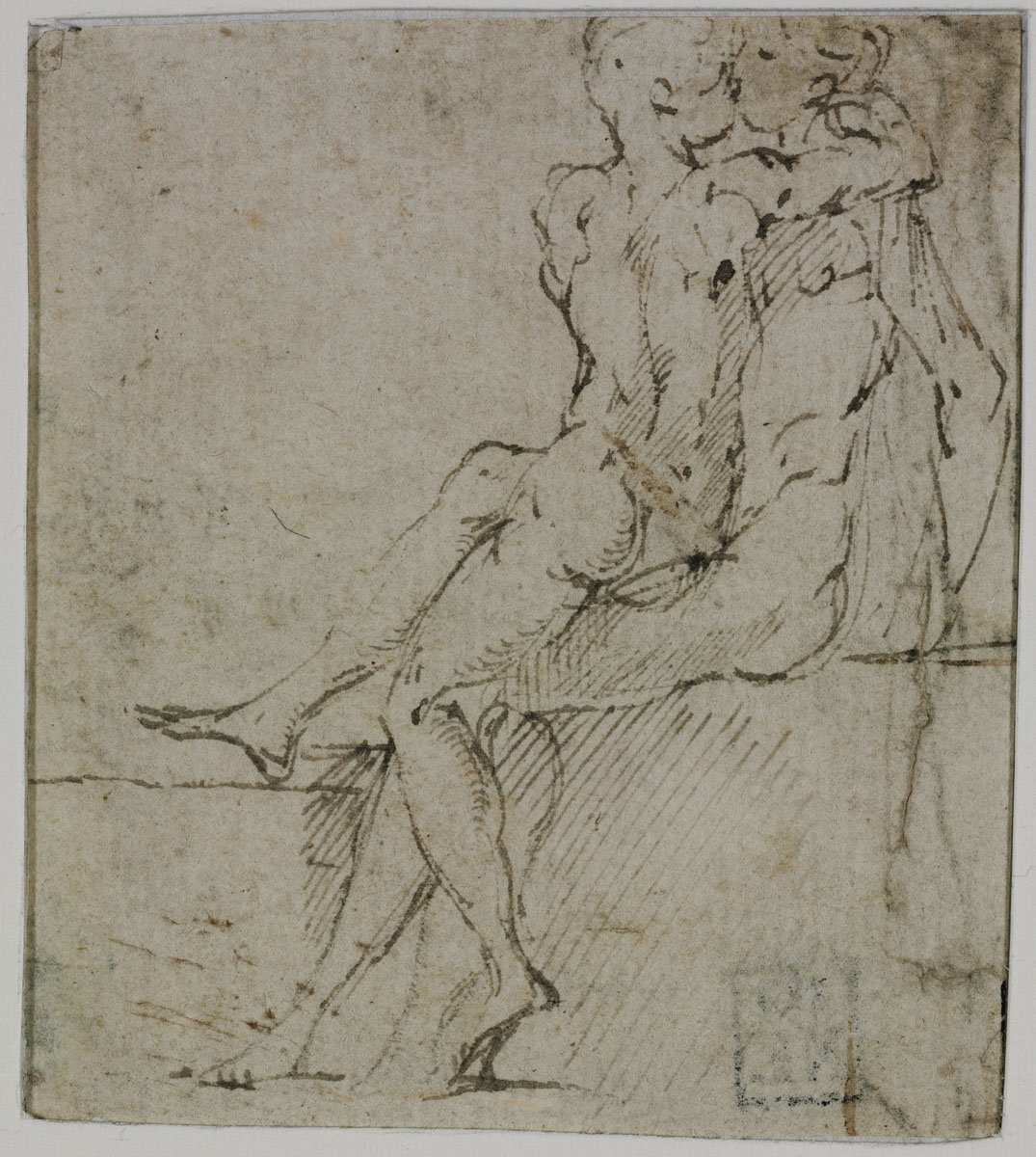
A second drawing by Parmigianino with similarities to image 10. Pen, ink on paper. 1524–1527.

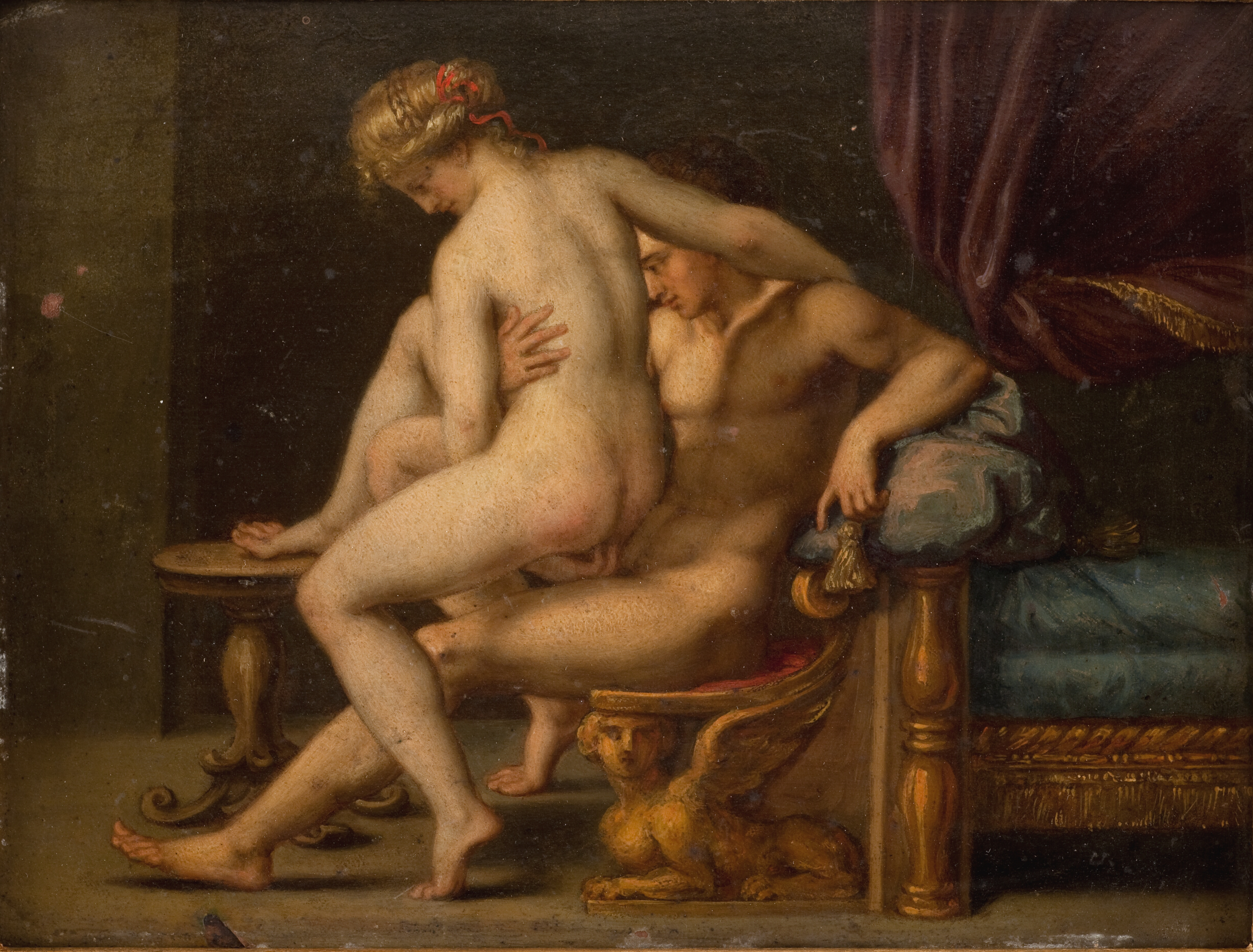
A painting by Agostino Carracci with similarities to posture 10. Oil on copper. 1572-1602. Statens Museum for Kunst, accession number KMS15a.
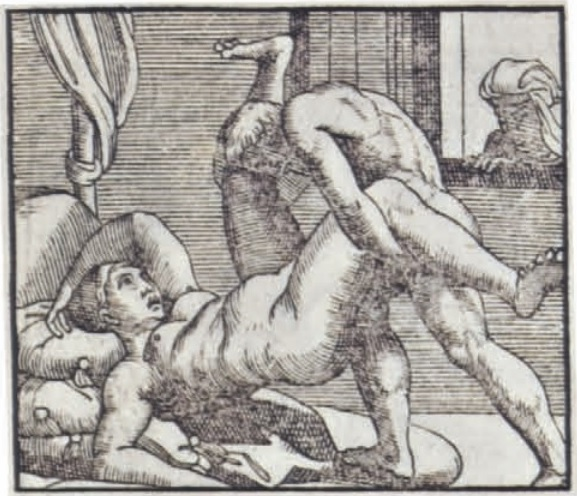
Image 11 woodcut booklet

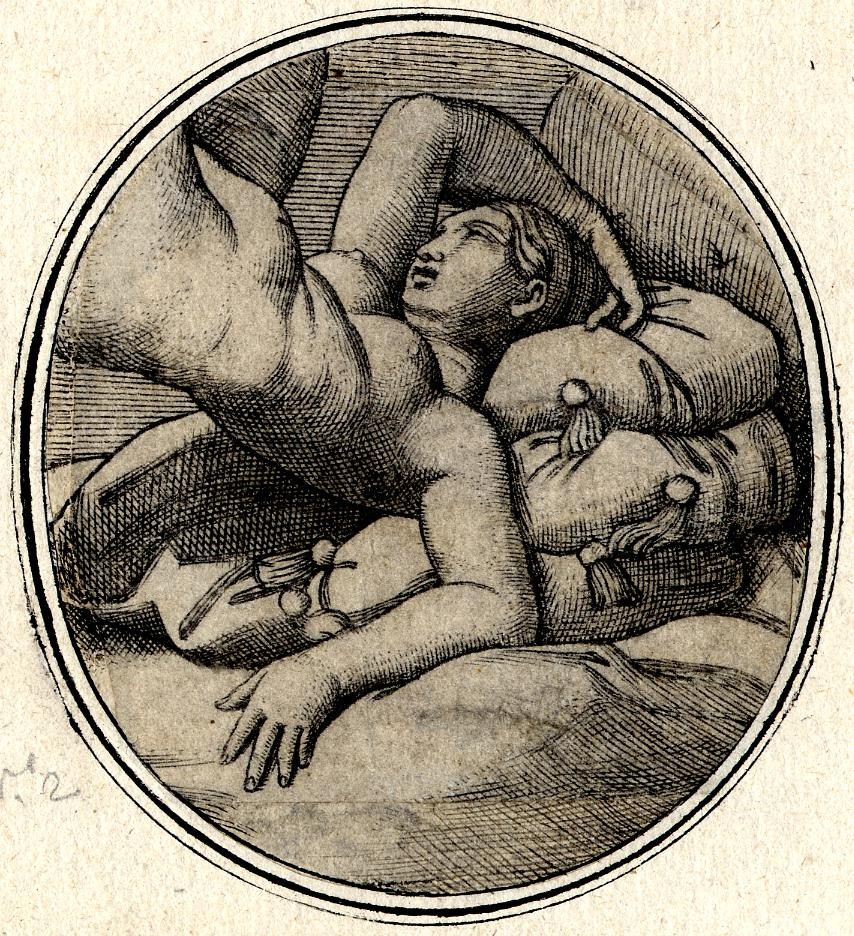
Corresponding fragment to image 11 thought to be by Agostino Veneziano. Around 1530.

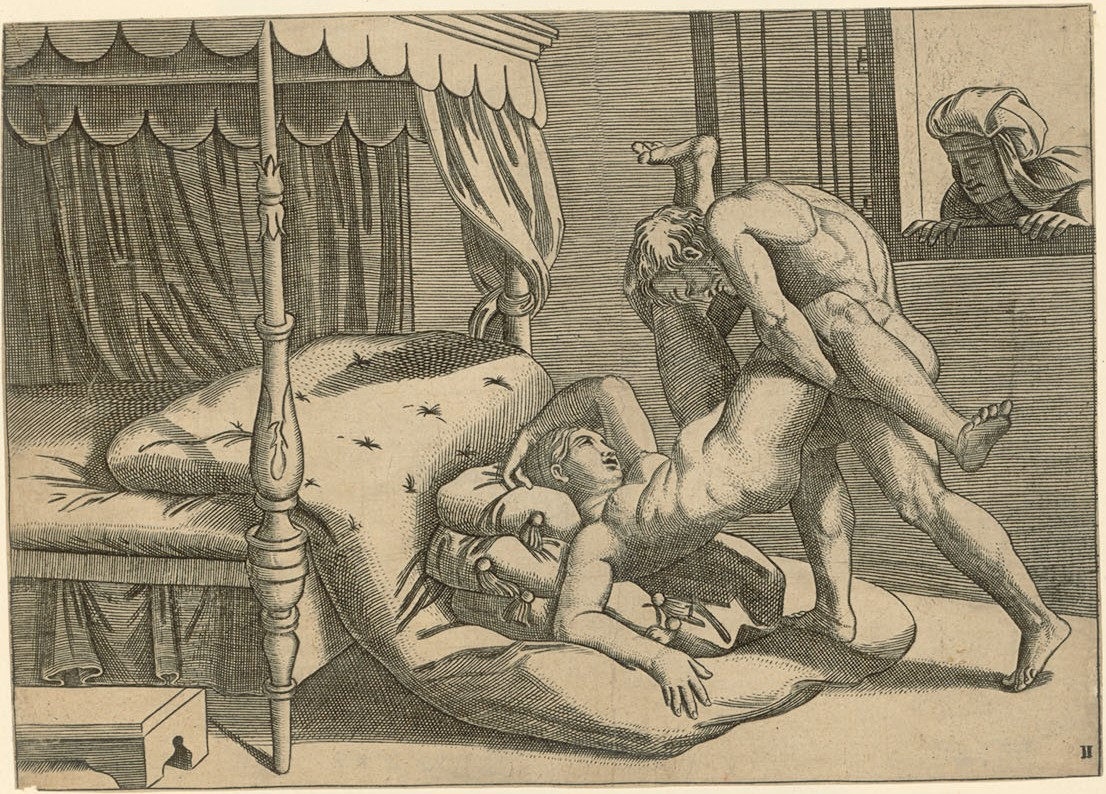
Anonymous engraving, Albertina museum, 16th century

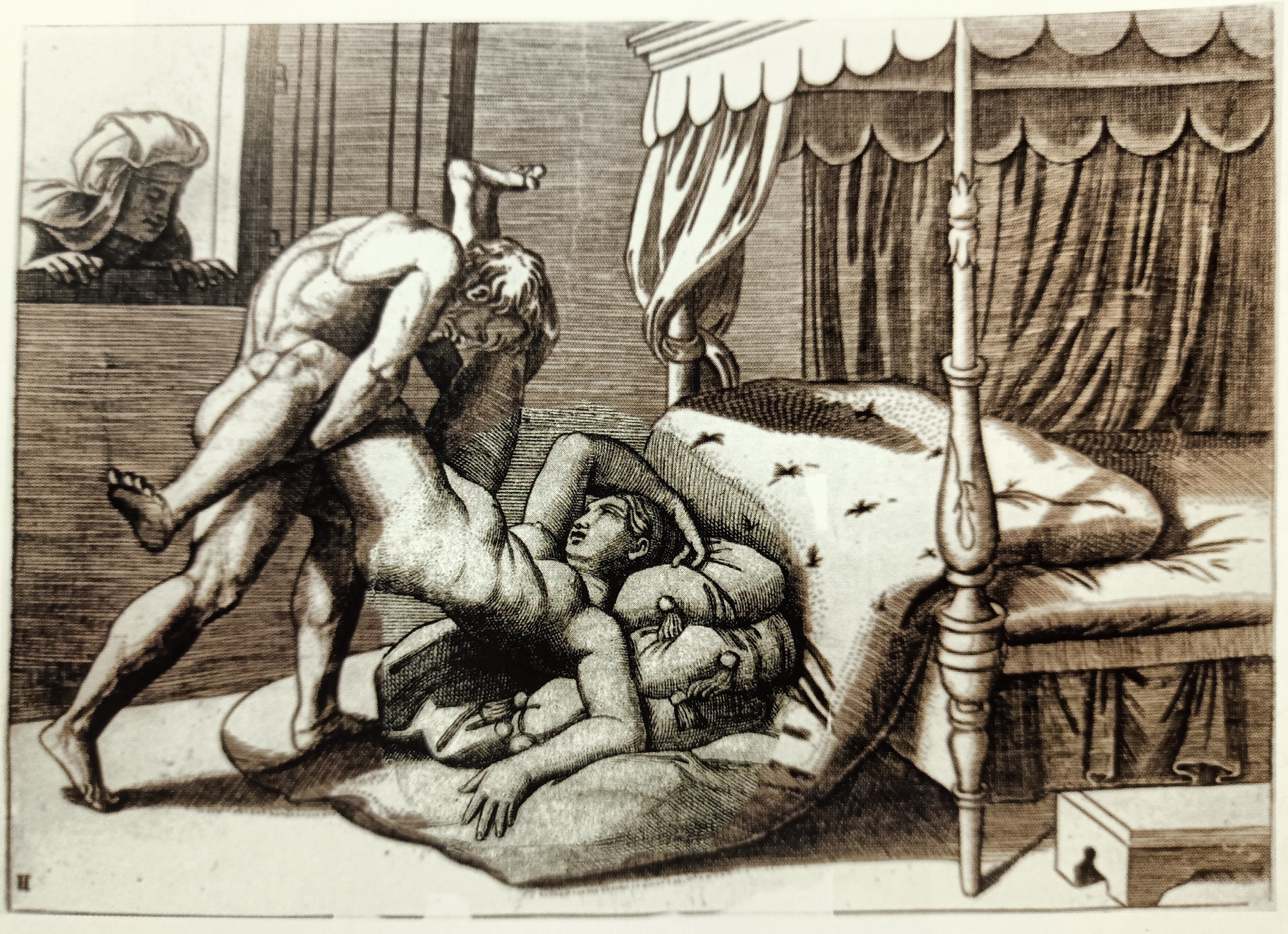
This image has been made from two engravings. The first engraving is from the Albertina museum, and the second is thought to be by Agostino Veneziano.
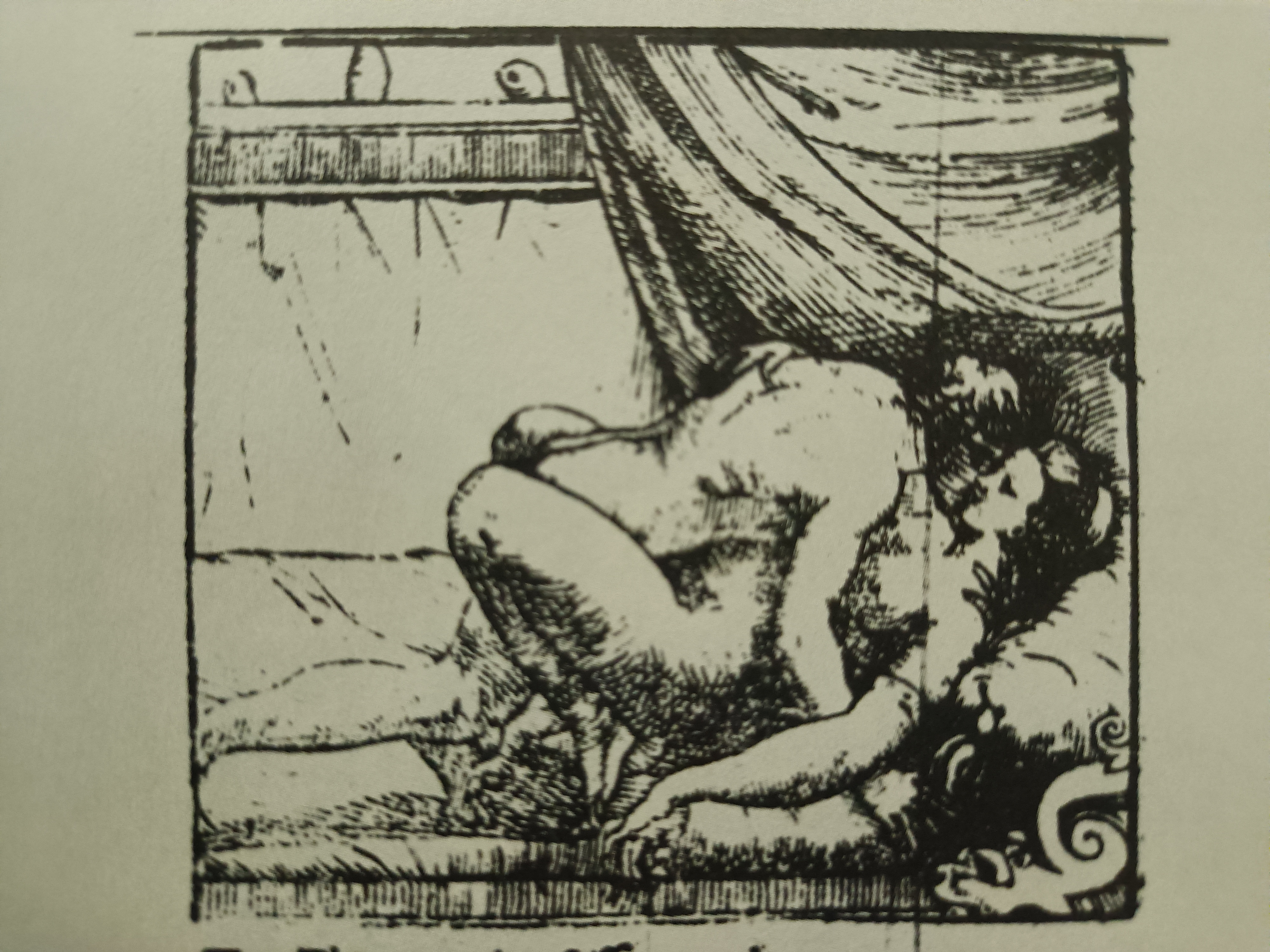
Image 12 woodcut booklet

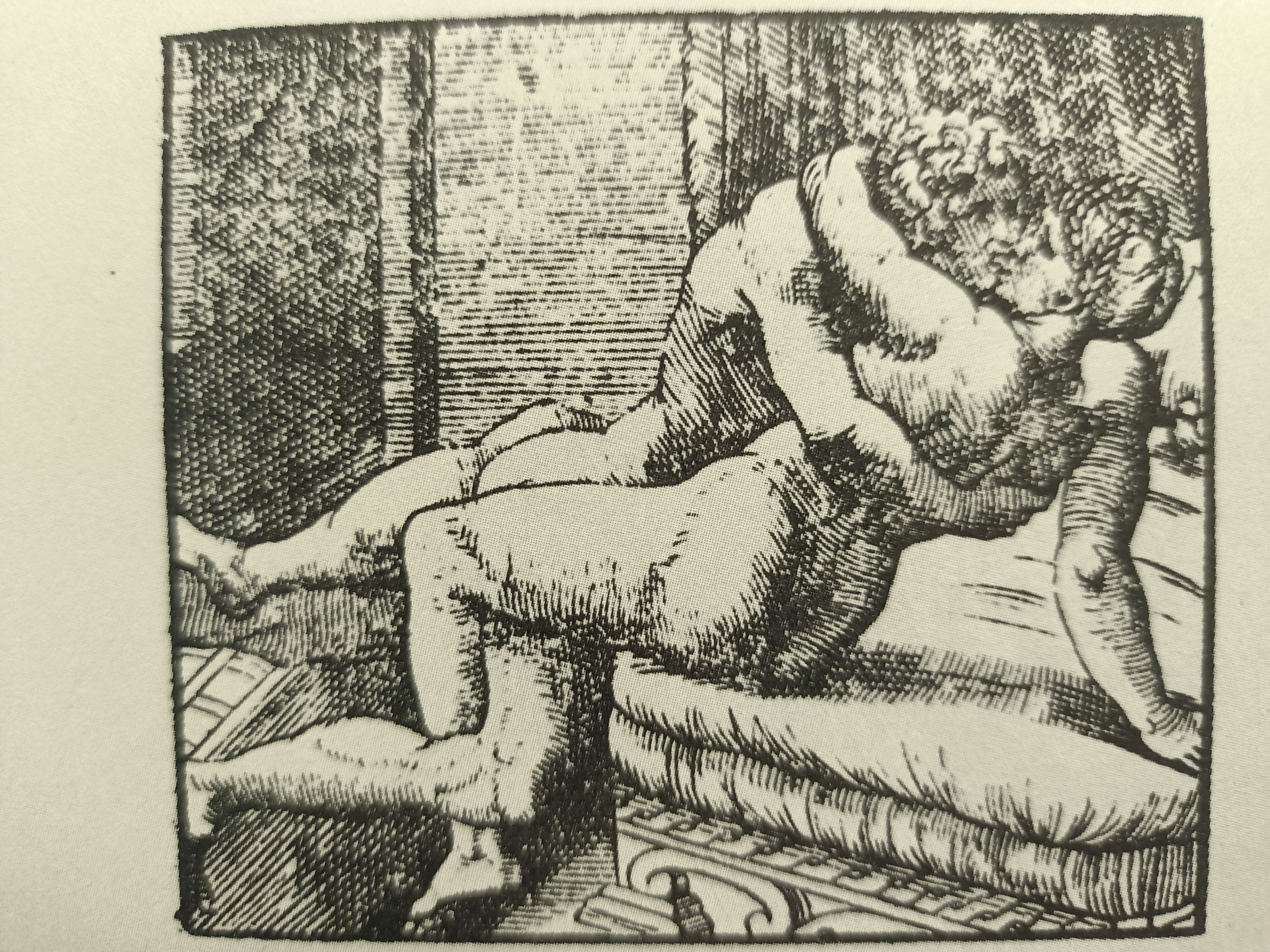
Image 13 woodcut booklet
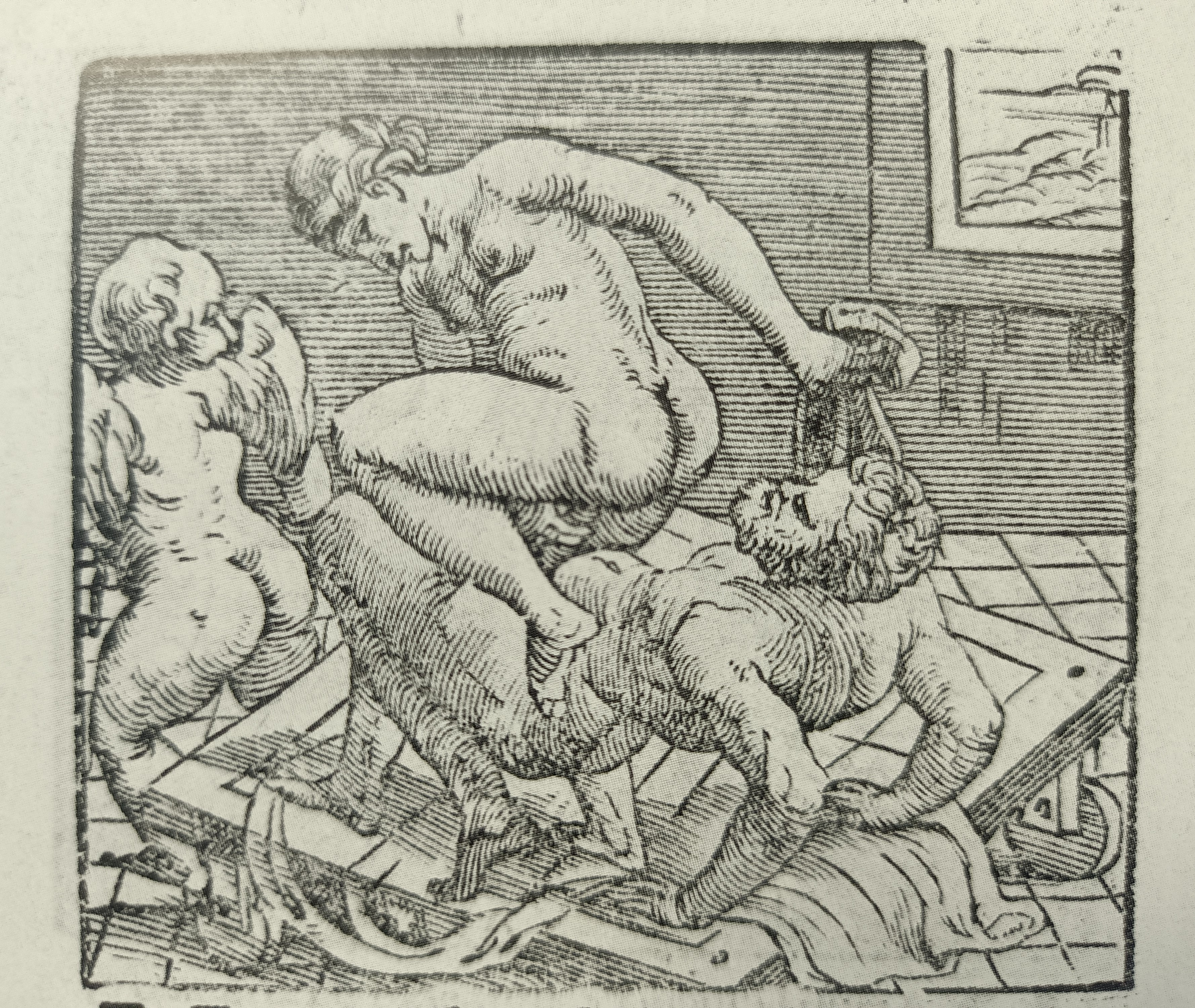
Image 14 woodcut booklet
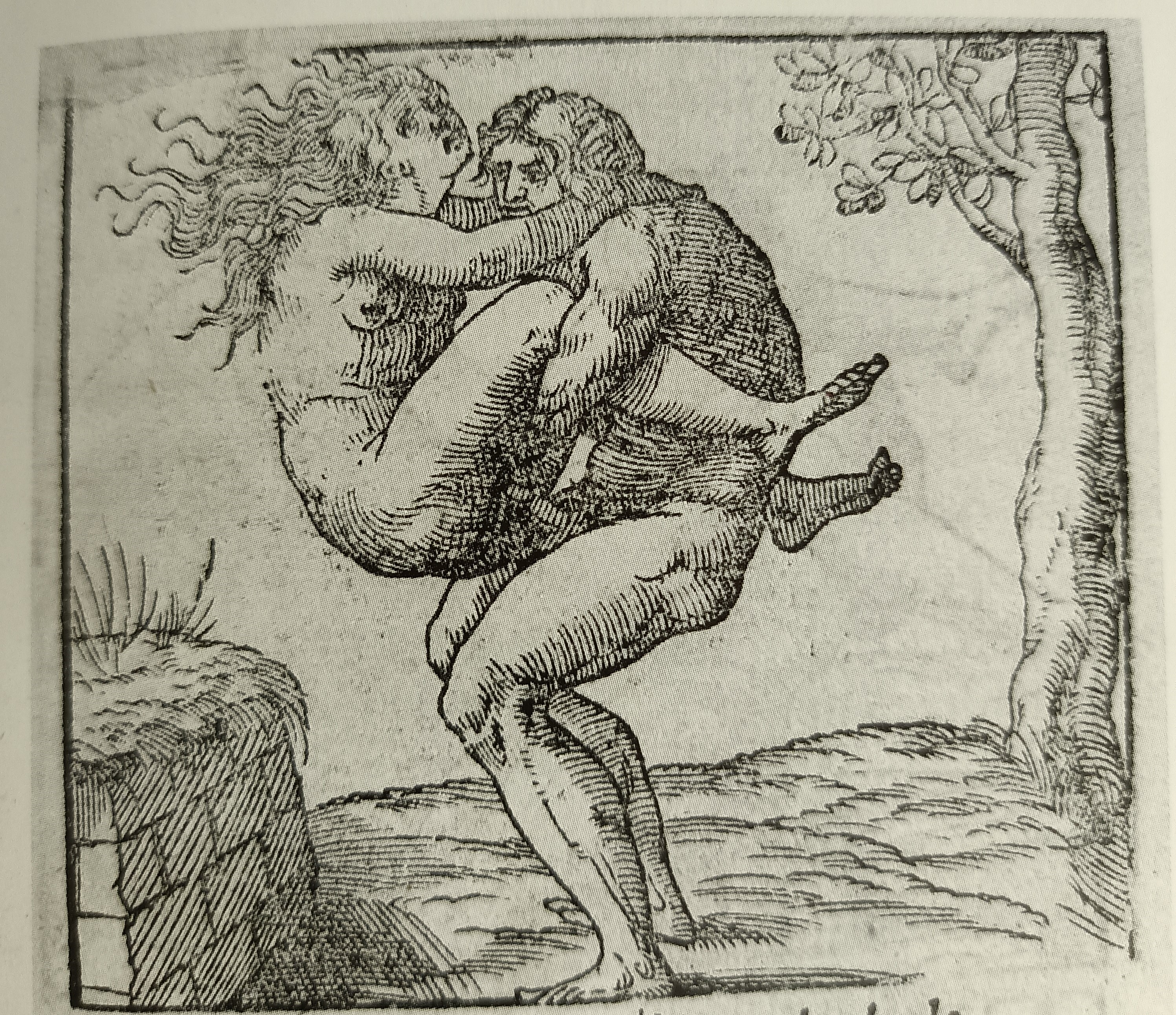
Image 15 woodcut booklet. The woodcut booklet has been described as having two images "…in the abbreviated final signature…[that] seem to come from different traditions." For the image with the standing figure it has been commented that "…both image and text differ markedly in style from those that precede them" in the woodcut booklet.

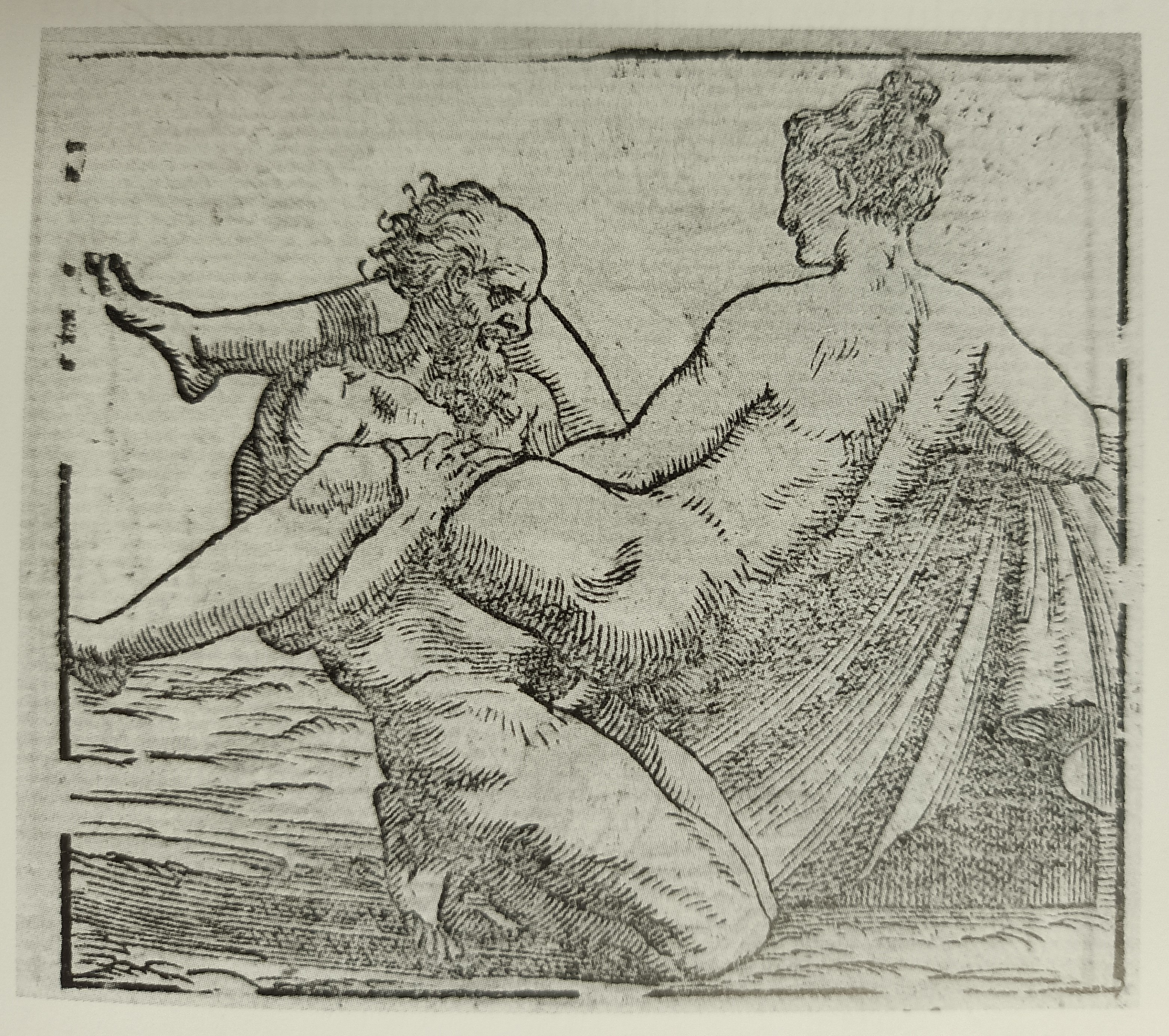
Image 16 woodcut booklet. In the Fossombrone sketchbook there are two drawings of sexual scenes and it is speculated that the figures in these drawings have similar postures to the figures in image 16 from the woodcut booklet. A second idea is that "...these drawings [in the fossombrone sketchbook] while fascinatingly similar to the Modi, differ even more significantly from anything in the visual remains of those prints, as well as from each other in composition and perhaps graphic style."
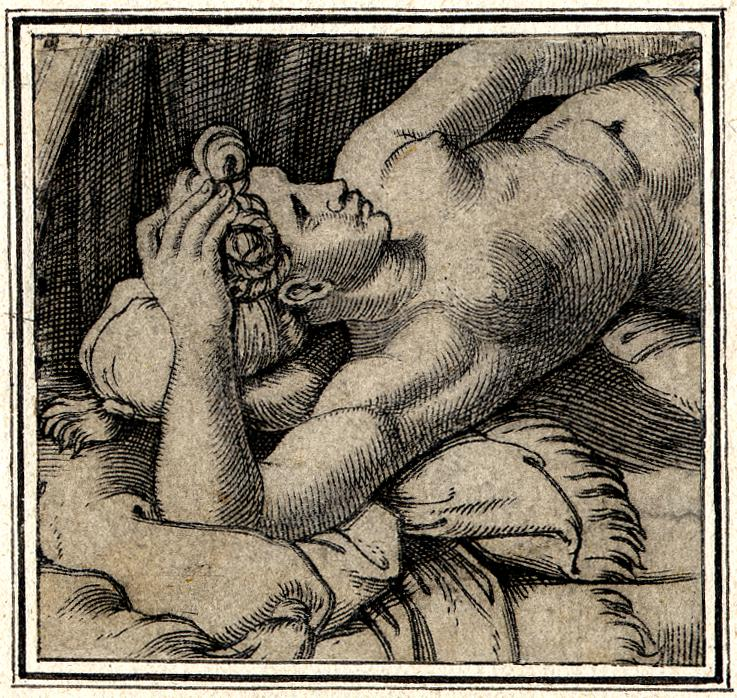
Two fragments cut from the one engraving. These fragments not present in the woodcut booklet. Both fragments are thought to be by Agostino Veneziano. Around 1530.

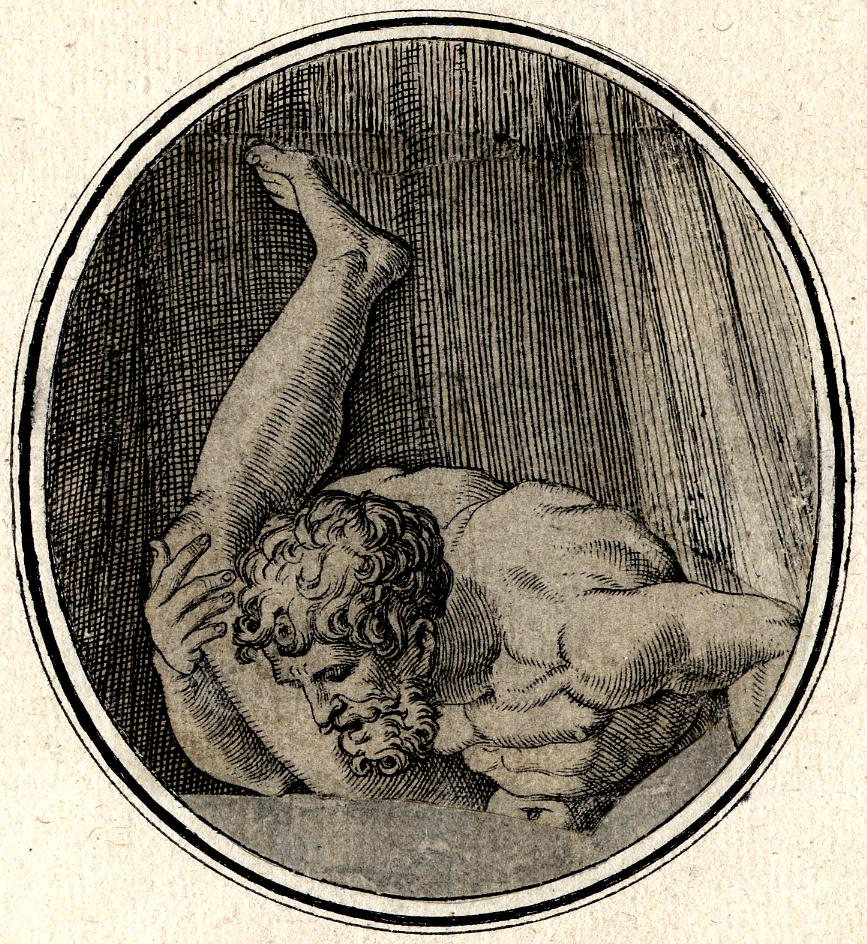
Second fragment that is not present in the woodcut booklet and thought to be by Agostino Veneziano. Around 1530.
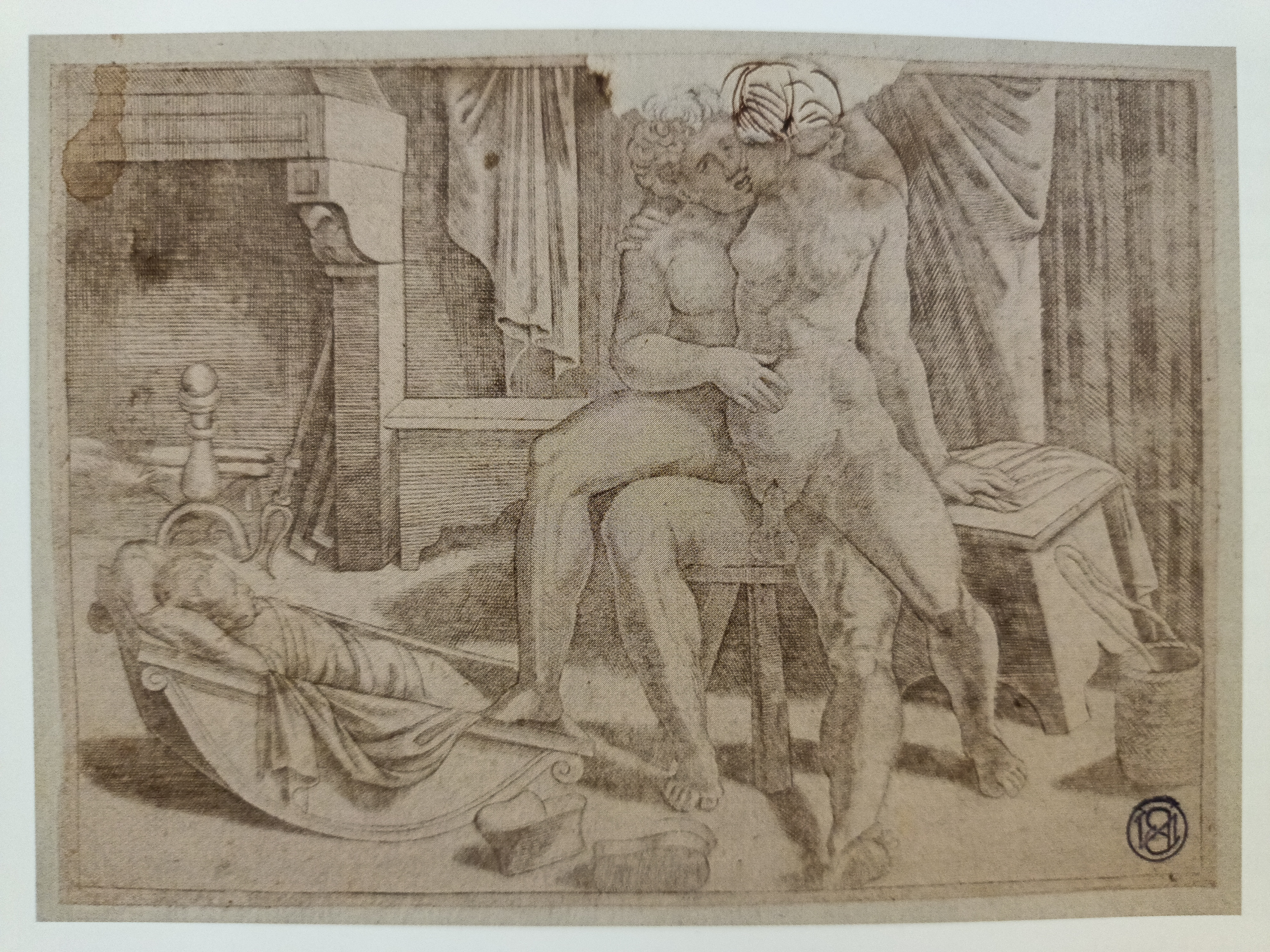
An engraving in the National Library of Spain that copies one scene from I modi. This engraving is not present in the woodcut booklet, and none of the fragments thought to be by Agostino Veneziano in the British Museum are related to this scene. It is by an unknown artist and dated to after 1530. This image has been reversed.

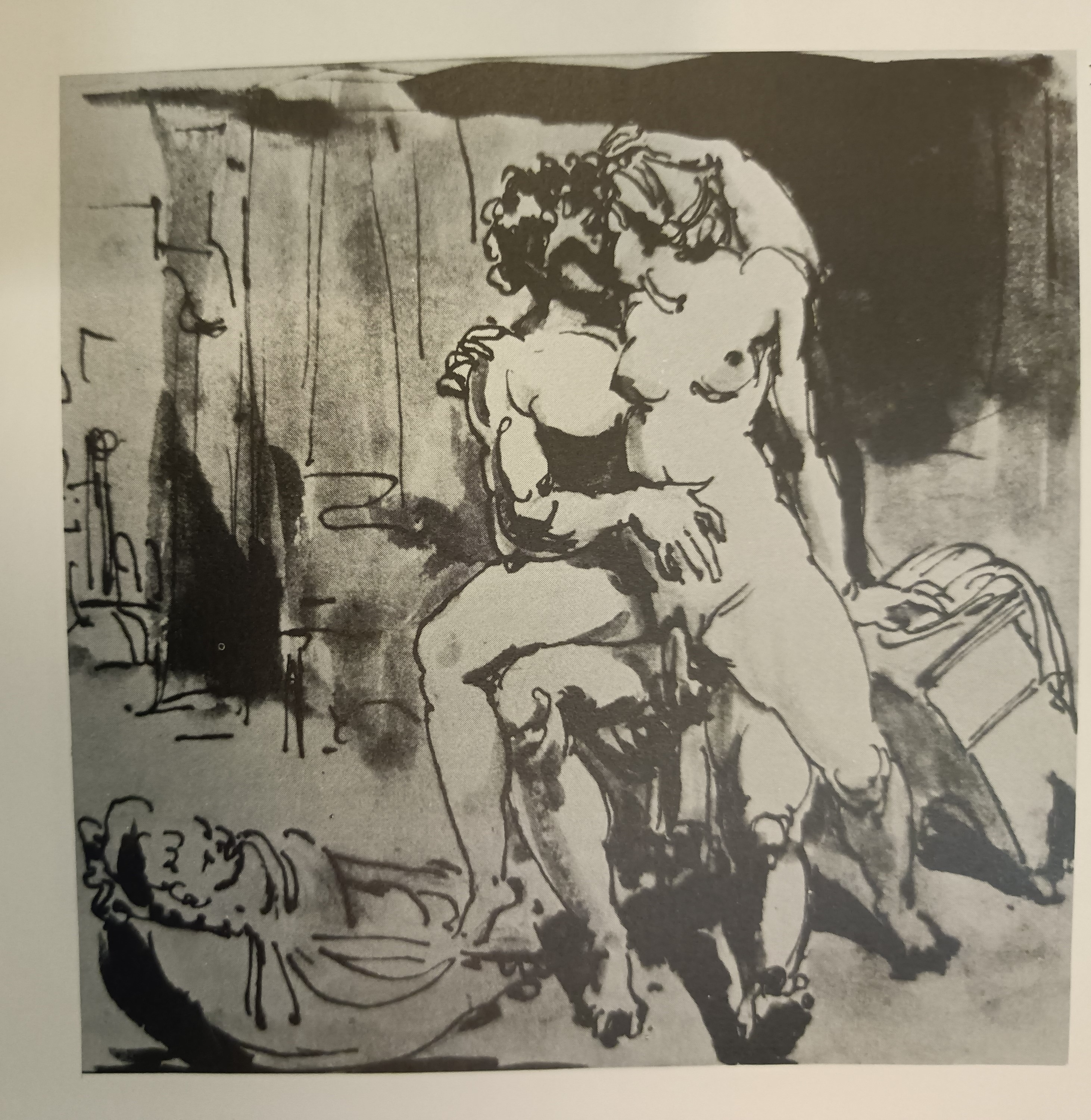
A sepia drawing by Johan Tobias Sergel (1740–1814) that possibly copies one scene from I modi. The scene that it copies can be seen on an engraving that is in the National Library of Spain.

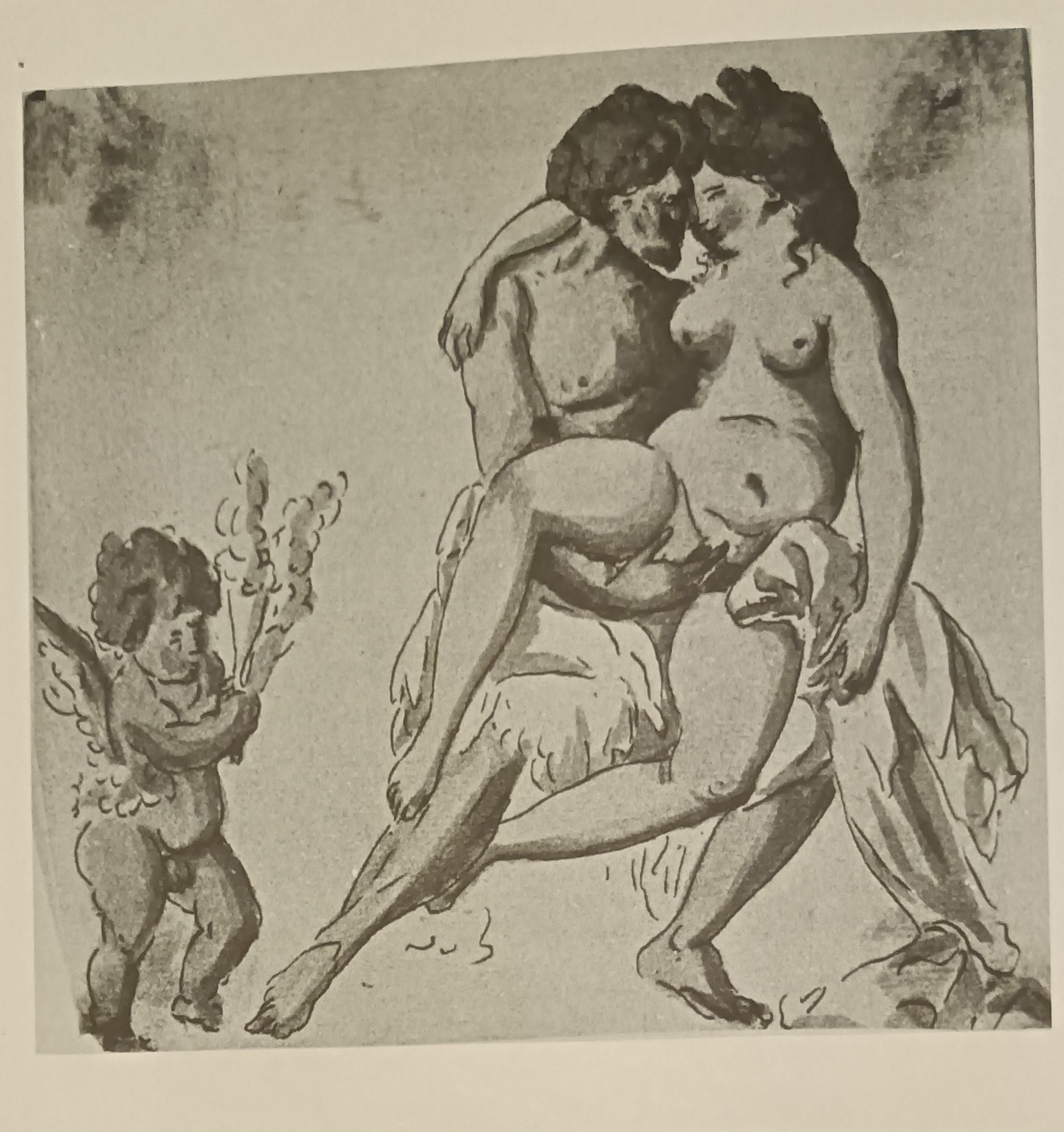
A second sepia drawing by Johan Tobias Sergel that has some similarities to a scene from I modi that is in the National Library of Spain.

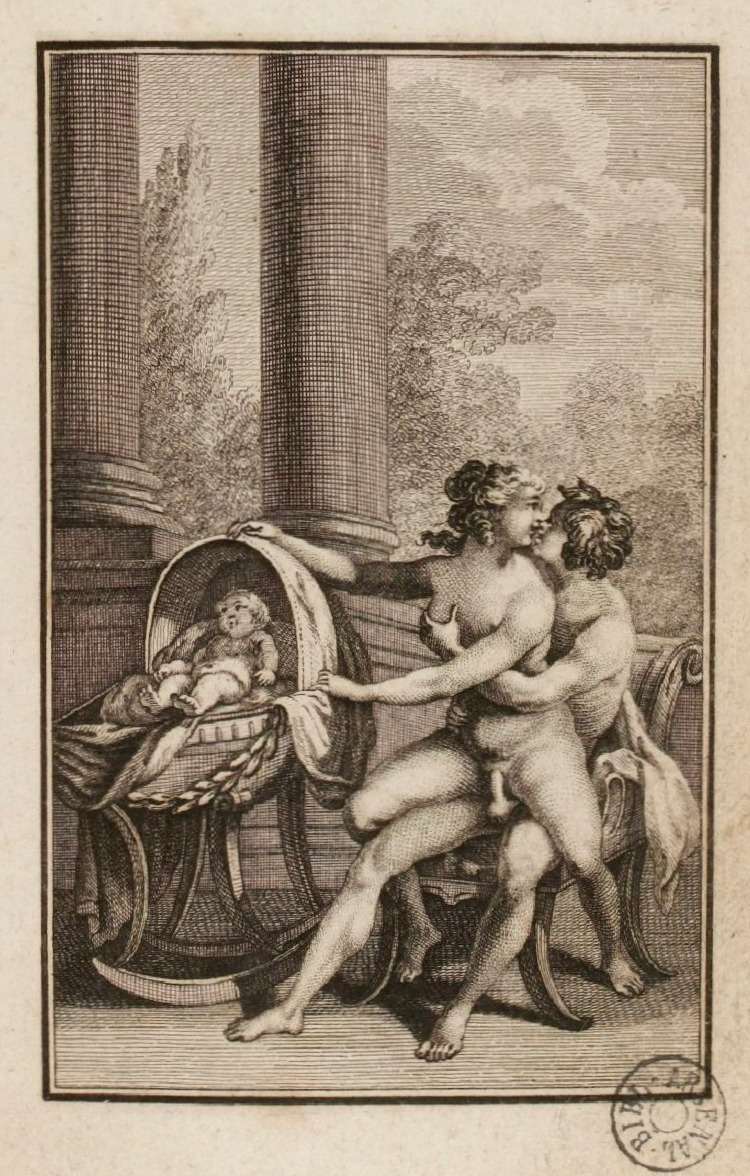
An engraving with similarities to a scene from I modi that is in the National Library of Spain. Engraving by Francois-Rolland Elluin from drawings by Antoine Borel. 1787

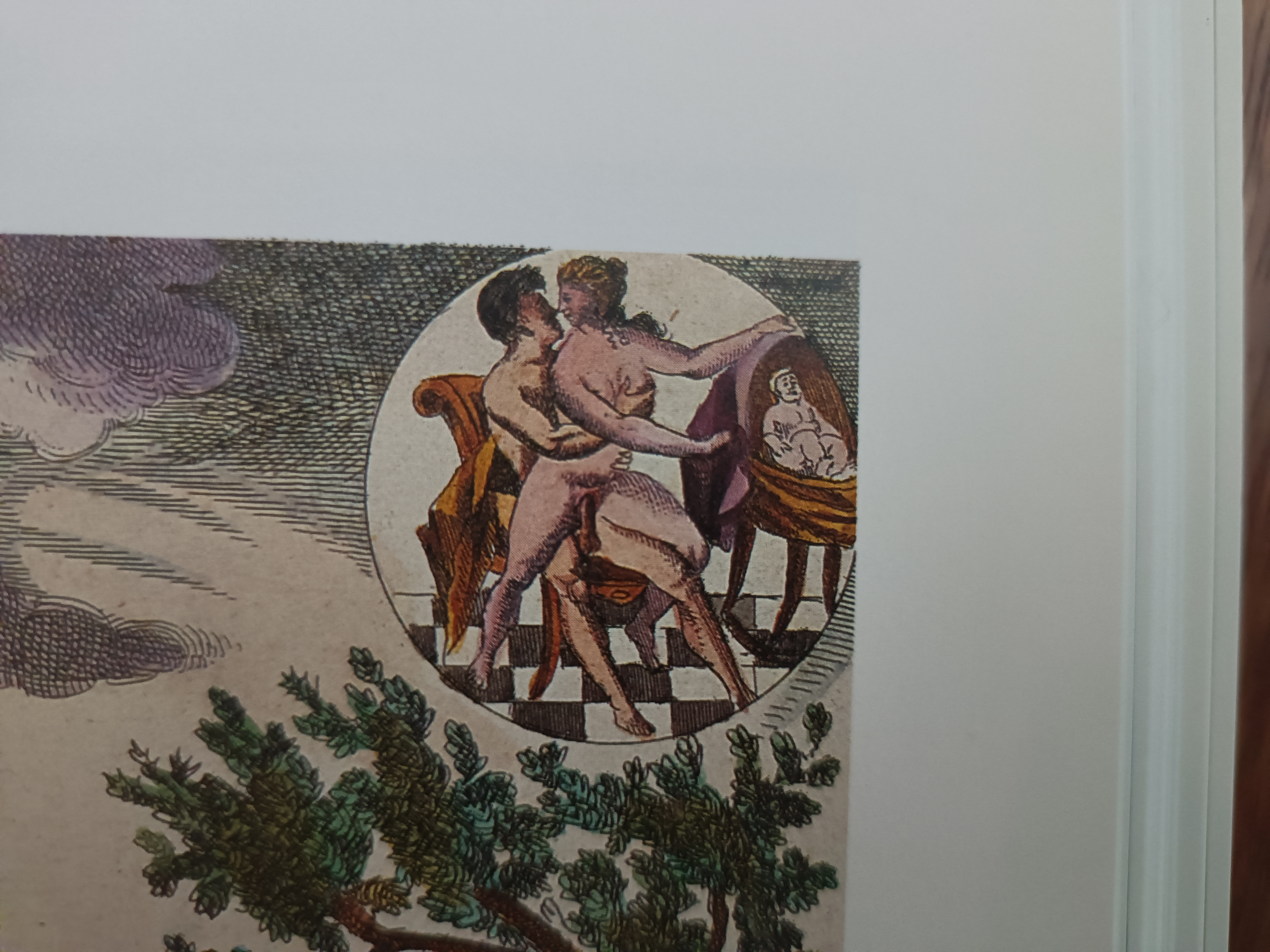
Detail of a copperplate engraving with similarities to a scene from I modi that is in the National Library of Spain. End of the 18th century.
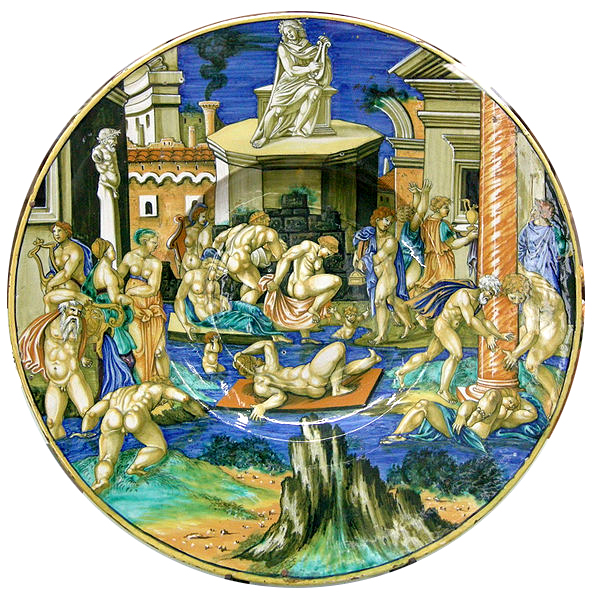
A maiolica dish titled The Tiber in Flood that was painted by Francesco Xanto Avelli. It is thought that between 1531 and 1535 Francesco Xanto Avelli saw Agostino Veneziano's copy of I modi. There are five figures on this dish that have the same postures as those in images numbered 1, 3, 8 and 14 in the woodcut booklet.

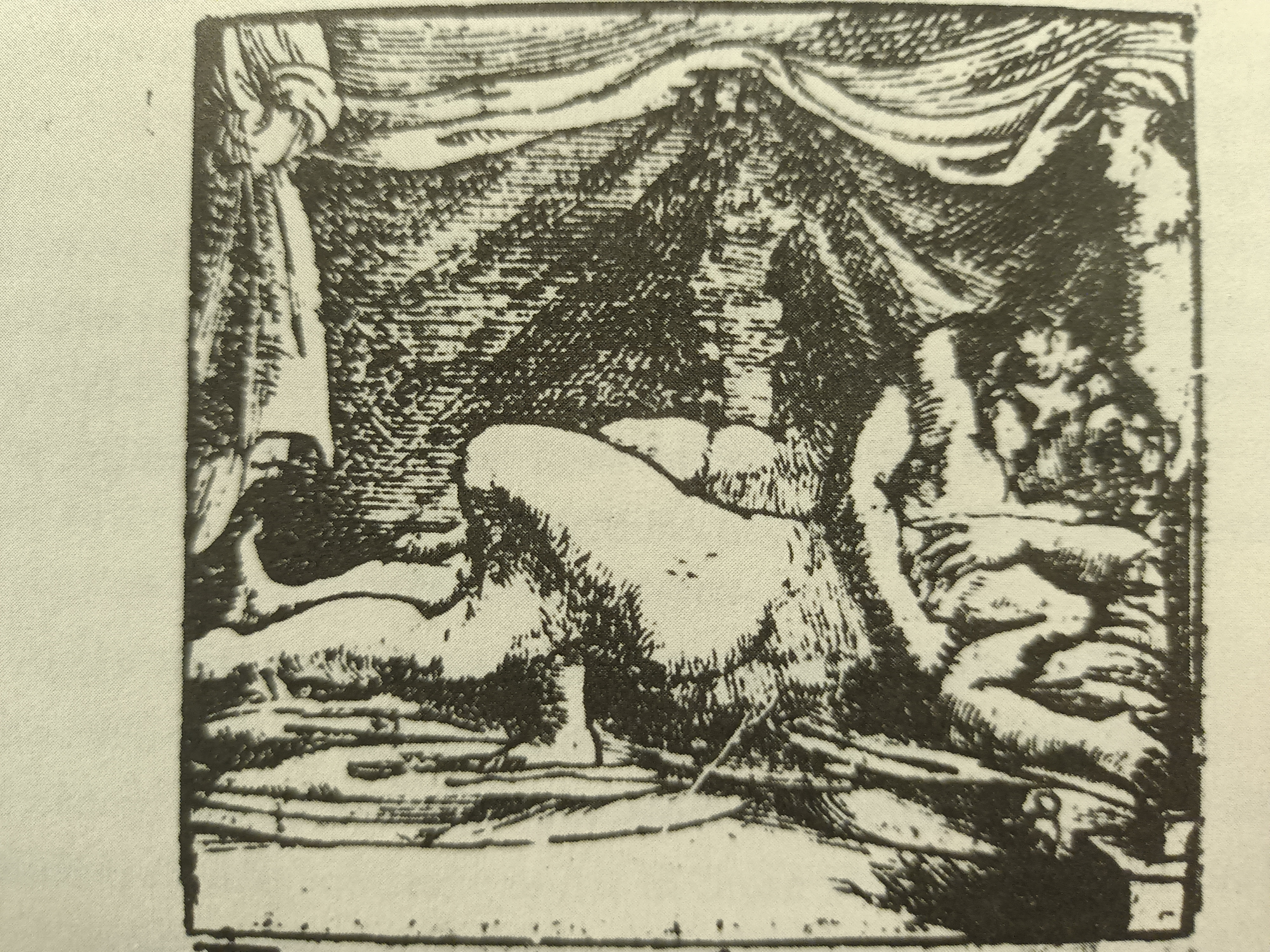
The first image from the woodcut booklet. One figure in this image has been copied in the maiolica dish titled The Tiber in Flood.

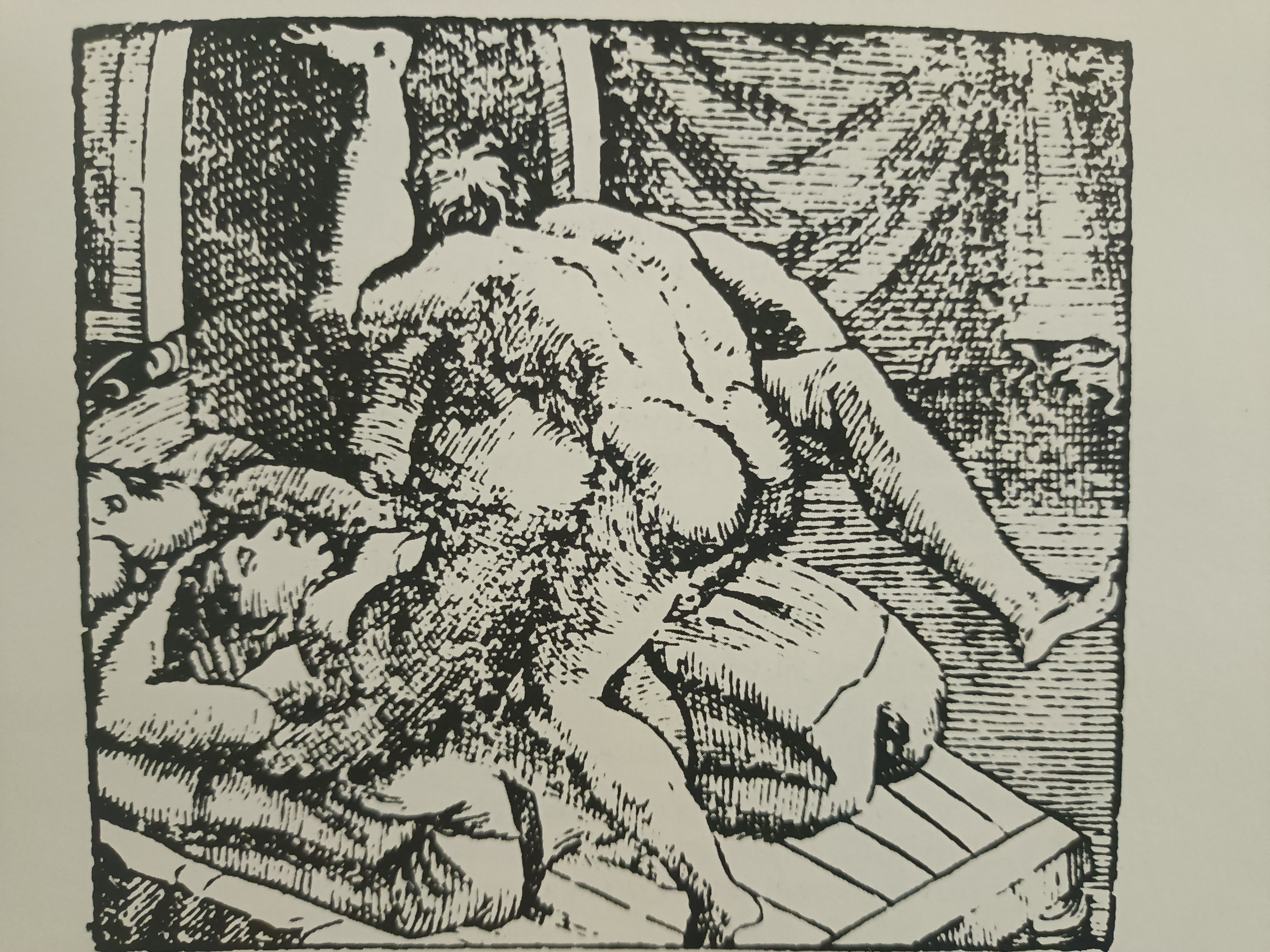
The eighth woodcut copy image of I modi. A figure in this image has been copied in the maiolica dish titled The Tiber in Flood.

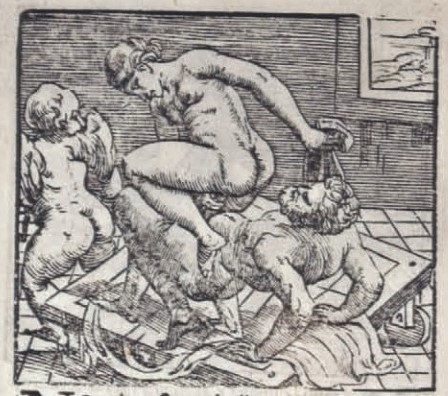
The fourteenth woodcut copy image of I modi. A figure in this image has been copied in the maiolica dish titled The Tiber in Flood.
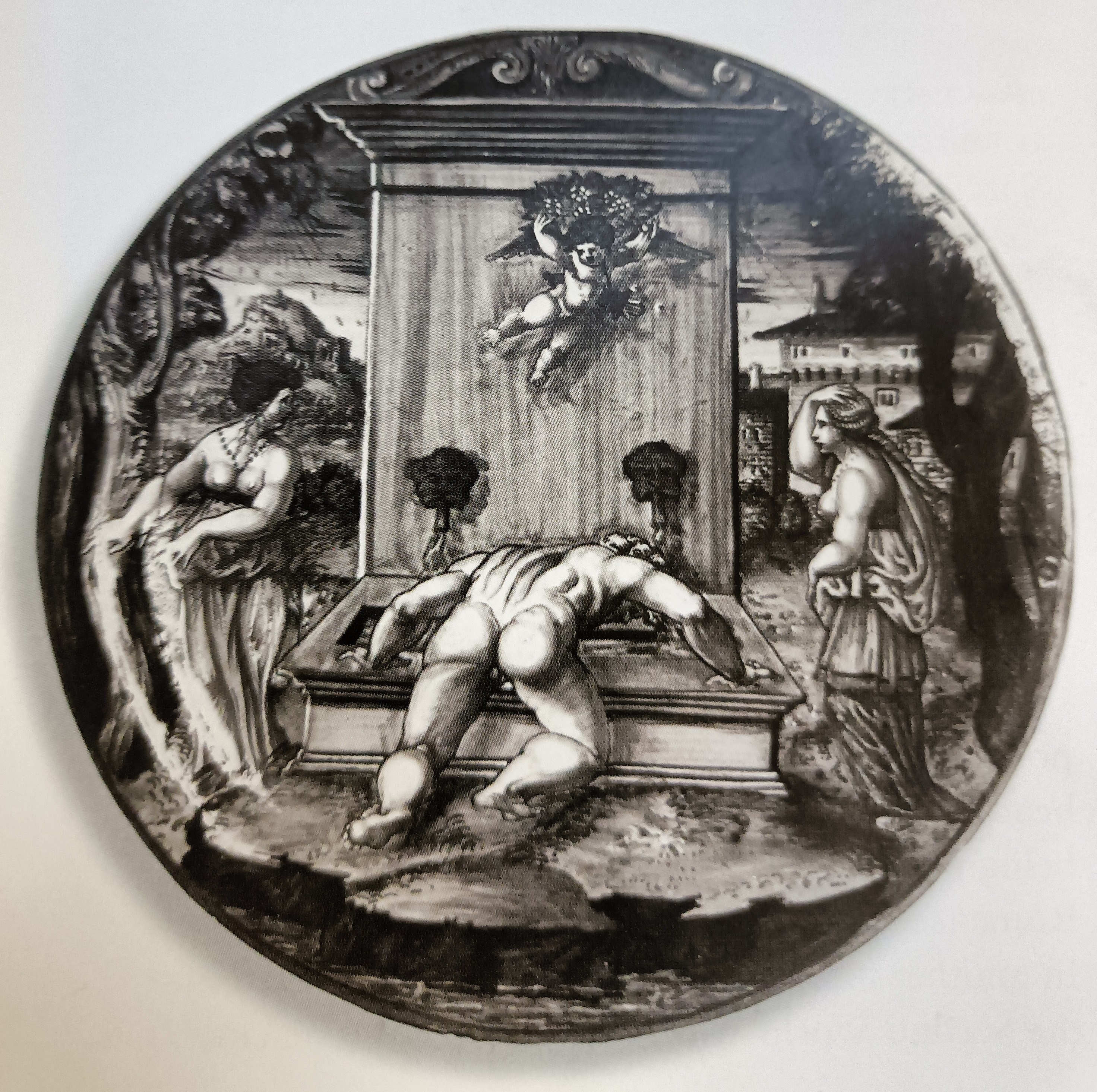
Francesco Xanto Avelli painted a second maiolica dish titled Narcissus (The vain lover of his own image). The figure of Narcissus on this Maiolica dish has been copied from the third woodcut copy image of I modi.
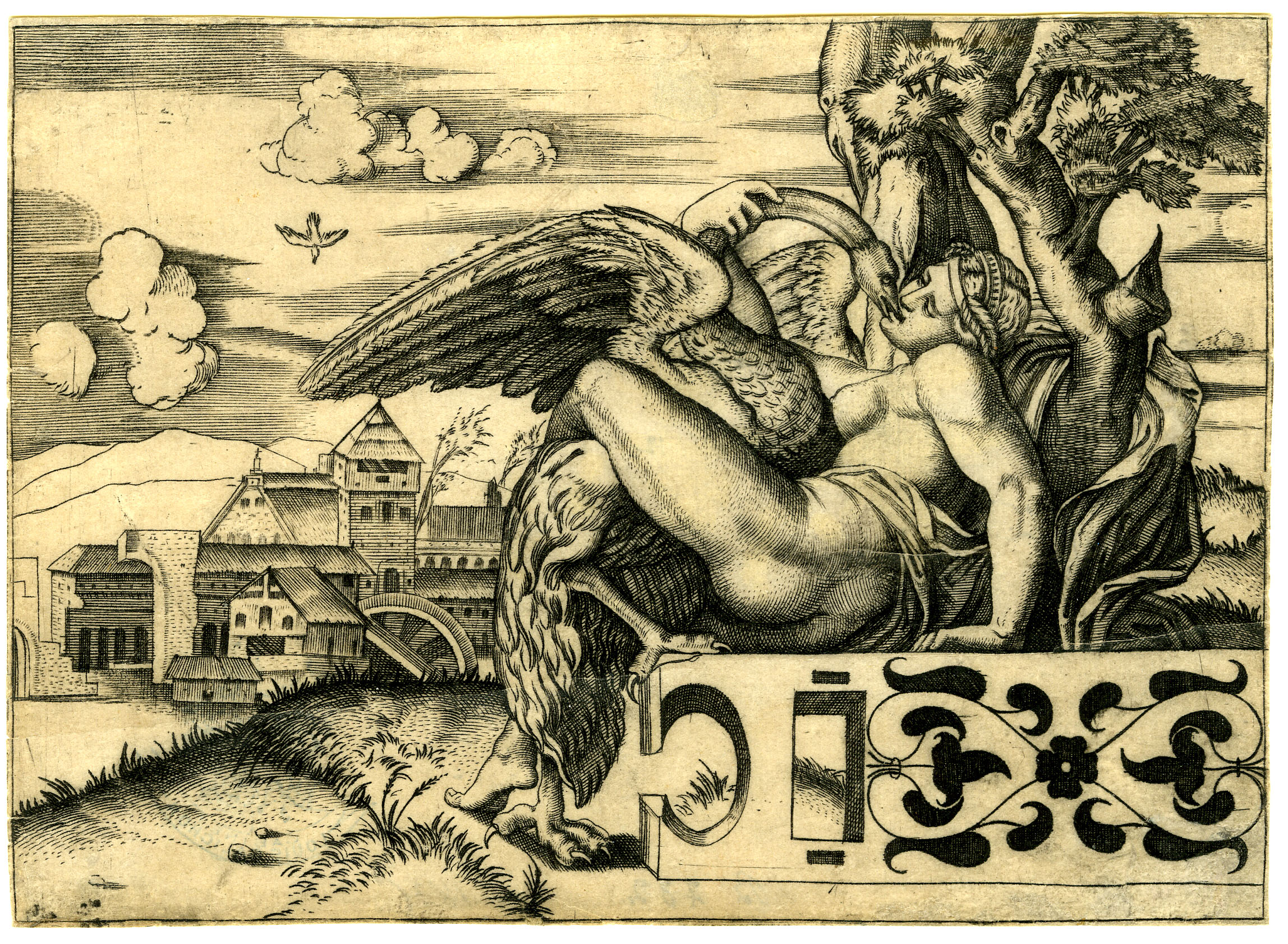
This engraving of Leda and the Swan is not present in the woodcut booklet. It is thought to be by Agostino Veneziano. It is speculated that this image is based on an image that was in the Giulio and Marcantonio edition of I modi. 1524–1527?

== Augustine Carracci's The Aretin or Collection of Erotic Postures by Jacques Joseph Coiny ==
In 1798, in Paris, a collection of engravings of sexual scenes were published under the title Augustine Carracci's The Aretin or Collection of Erotic Postures. The engravings were created by Jacques Joseph Coiny.

One theory is that these images were based on the erotic poses in The Loves of the Gods which was created at the start of the 17th century in Antwerp by Pieter de Jode I with the use of burin. It presently remains uncertain what images these engravings were based on. It is thought that Coiny had a set of six anonymous prints, and it is difficult to say which prints these were.

A second idea is that these engravings were created by Camillo Procaccini, though based on Carracci drawings, which in turn are very similar to the engravings in the edition of I modi by Giulio and Marcantonio. A third idea is that they were created by Agostino Carracci for a later reprint of Aretino's poems.

=== Classical guise in Augustine Carracci's The Aretin or Collection of Erotic Postures ===
Several factors were used to cloak these engravings from Augustine Carracci's The Aretin or Collection of Erotic Postures in classical scholarly respectability:

- The images nominally depicted famous pairings of lovers (e.g. Antony and Cleopatra) or husband-and-wife deities (e.g. Jupiter and Juno) from classical history and mythology engaged in sexual activity, and were entitled as such. Related to this were:
  - Portraying them with their usual attributes, such as:
    - Cleopatra's banquets, bottom left
    - Achilles's shield and helmet, bottom left
    - Hercules in his lion-skin and club
    - Mars with his cuirass
    - Paris as a shepherd
    - Bacchus with his vine-leaf crown and (bottom right) grapes
  - Referring to the best-known myths or historical events in which they appeared, e.g.:
    - Mars and Venus under the net which her husband Vulcan has designed to catch them
    - 'Aeneas' and 'Dido' in the cave in which their sexual intercourse is alluded in Aeneid, Book 4
    - Theseus abandoning Ariadne on Naxos, where Bacchus finds and marries her.
    - The wide adultery of Julia
    - Messalina's participation in prostitution, as criticised in Juvenal's Satire VI.
  - Referring to other Renaissance and classical tropes in the depiction of these people and deities, such as
    - The contrast between Mars's dark hair and tanned skin and his partner Venus's untanned, fair skin and fair or even blond hair.
    - Jupiter's full beard
- The frontispiece image is entitled Venus Genetrix, and the goddess is nude and drawn in a chariot by doves, as in the classical sources.
- The bodies of those depicted show clear influences from classical statuary known at the time, such as:
  - The over-muscled torsos and backs of the men (drawn from sculptures such as the Laocoön and His Sons, Belvedere Torso, and Farnese Hercules).
  - The women's clearly defined though small breasts (drawn from examples such as the Venus de' Medici and Aphrodite of Cnidus)
  - The elaborate hairstyles of some of the women, such as his Venus, Juno or Cleopatra (derived from Roman Imperial era busts such as this one).
- Portraying the action in a classical 'stage set' such as an ancient Greek sanctuary or temple.
- The large erect penis on the statue of Priapus or Pan atop a puteal in 'The Cult of Priapus' is derived from examples in classical sculpture and painting (like this fresco) which were beginning to be found archaeologically at this time.

=== Differences from antique art ===
Augustine Carracci's The Aretin or Collection of Erotic Postures has various points of deviation from classical literature, erotica, mythology and art which suggest its classical learning is lightly worn, and make clear its actual modern setting:

- The male sexual partners' large penises (though not Priapus's) are the artist's invention rather than a classical borrowing – the idealised penis in classical art was small, not large (large penises were seen as comic or fertility symbols, as for example on Priapus, as discussed above).
- The title 'Polyenus and Chryseis' pairs the fictional Polyenus with the actual mythological character Chryseis.
- The title 'Alcibiades and Glycera' pairs two historical figures from different periods – the 5th-century BC Alcibiades and the 4th-century BC Glycera
- Female satyrs did not occur in classical mythology, yet they appear twice in this work (in 'The Satyr and his wife' and 'The Cult of Priapus').
- All the women and goddesses in this work (but most clearly its Venus Genetrix) have a hairless groin (like classical statuary of nude females) but also a clearly apparent vulva (unlike classical statuary).
- The modern furniture, e.g.
  - The various stools and cushions used to support the participants or otherwise raise them into the right positions (e.g. here)
  - The other sex aids (e.g. a whip, bottom right)
  - The 16th-century beds, with ornate curtains, carvings, tasselled cushions, bedposts, etc.

=== Engravings from Augustine Carracci's The Aretin or Collection of Erotic Postures ===
The images in the table below are the engravings from Augustine Carracci's The Aretin or Collection of Erotic Postures.

These engravings have inspired the creation of erotic art from other artists including Paul Avril.

Image	No.	Title (English translation)	Male partner	Female partner	Sexual position	Notes
	1	Venus Genetrix	-	Venus Genetrix	Female figure study of nude in frontal disposition	-
	2	Paris and Oenone	Paris	Oenone	Side-by-side, man on top	
	3	Angelique and Medor	Medor	Angelique	Reverse cowgirl	Characters from Ludovico Ariosto's Orlando Furioso
	4	The satyr and the nymph	Satyr	Nymph	Missionary position (man on top and standing, woman lying)	
	5	Julia with an athlete	An athlete	Julia the Elder	Reverse cowgirl (woman standing)	Woman guiding in penis
	6	Hercules and Deianaira	Hercules	Deianira	Standing missionary (woman supported by man)	
	7	Mars and Venus	Mars	Venus	Missionary (woman on top)	
	8	The Cult of Priapus	Pan, or a male satyr	A female satyr	Missionary (male standing, woman sitting)	Statue of Priapus with characteristically disproportionate erection
	9	Antony and Cleopatra	Mark Antony	Cleopatra	Side-by-side missionary	Woman guiding in penis
	10	Bacchus and Ariadne	Bacchus	Ariadne	Leapfrog - woman entirely supported	Woman's legs up not kneeling as usual in this position
	11	Polyenos and Chriseis	Polyenos (fictional)	Chryseis	Missionary (man on top and standing, woman lying)	
	12	A satyr and his wife	Male satyr	Female satyr	Missionary (man standing, woman sitting)	
	13	Jupiter and Juno	Jupiter	Juno	Standing (man standing/kneeling, woman supported)	
	14	Messalina in the booth of 'Lisica'	Brothel client	Messalina	Missionary (female lying, male standing)	
	15	Achilles and Briseis	Achilles	Briseis	Standing (man entirely supporting woman)	
	16	Ovid and Corinna	Ovid	Corinna	Missionary (man on top, woman guiding erect penis into her vagina)	Woman deepening penetration by having her legs outside his.
	17	Aeneas and Dido [accompanied by a Cupid]	Aeneas	Dido	Fingering with left hand index finger (thus little nudity relative to other images)	Lesser nudity, though wet T-shirt effect round breasts; Cupid is erect
	18	Alcibiades and Glycera	Alcibiades	Glycera	Missionary (man on top and standing, woman lying and legs up)	Man also raised up to right level for vagina by right foot on step
	19	Pandora	?Epimetheus (crowned figure)	Pandora	Side by side	The boy with the candle may be a classical reference.

== Erotic art in the 15th and 16th century ==
=== Drawings - Fossombrone Sketchbook - Workshop of Raphael ===
In the Fossombrone sketchbook, which is from the workshop of Raphael, there are two drawings that show sex between two people.

One idea is that these two drawings are based on "I modi" engravings. Image 16 from the woodcut booklet has some similarities to both of these drawings.

Another idea that has been speculated is that they show "...independent permutations and variations on sexual motifs perhaps from an antique source, perhaps invented in Raphael's studio." Further that "...these drawings while fascinatingly similar to the Modi, differ even more significantly from anything in the visual remains of those prints, as well as from each other in composition and perhaps graphic style."

It was further commented that these two drawings "...allow the Modi to be understood as emerging from a collective enterprise, rather than as unique orignary models." and that "...these erotic scenes [can be seen] as pure fantasia, products of heated imagination."

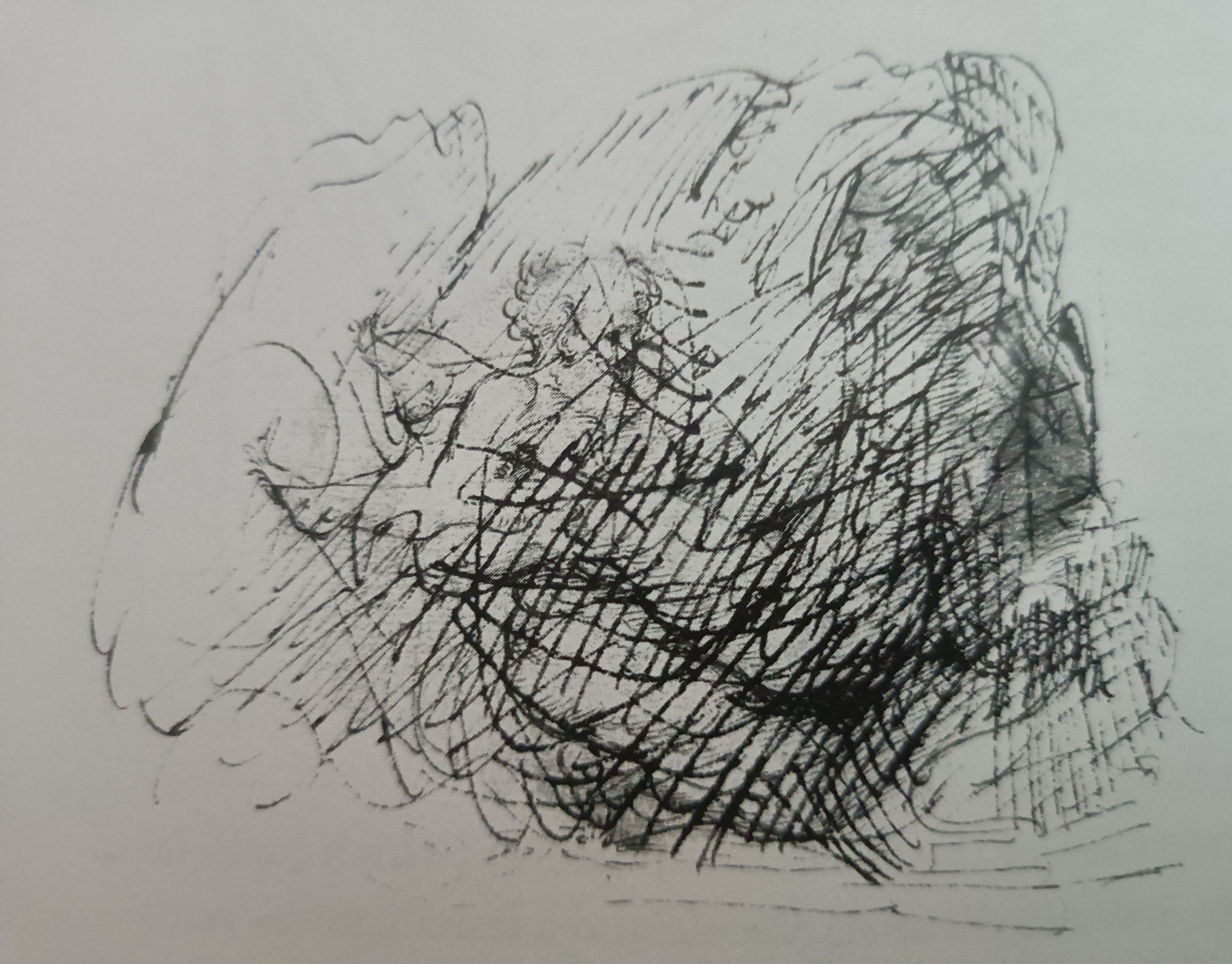
Sex between a female and a male on a kline. Drawing. From the Fossombrone sketchbook.

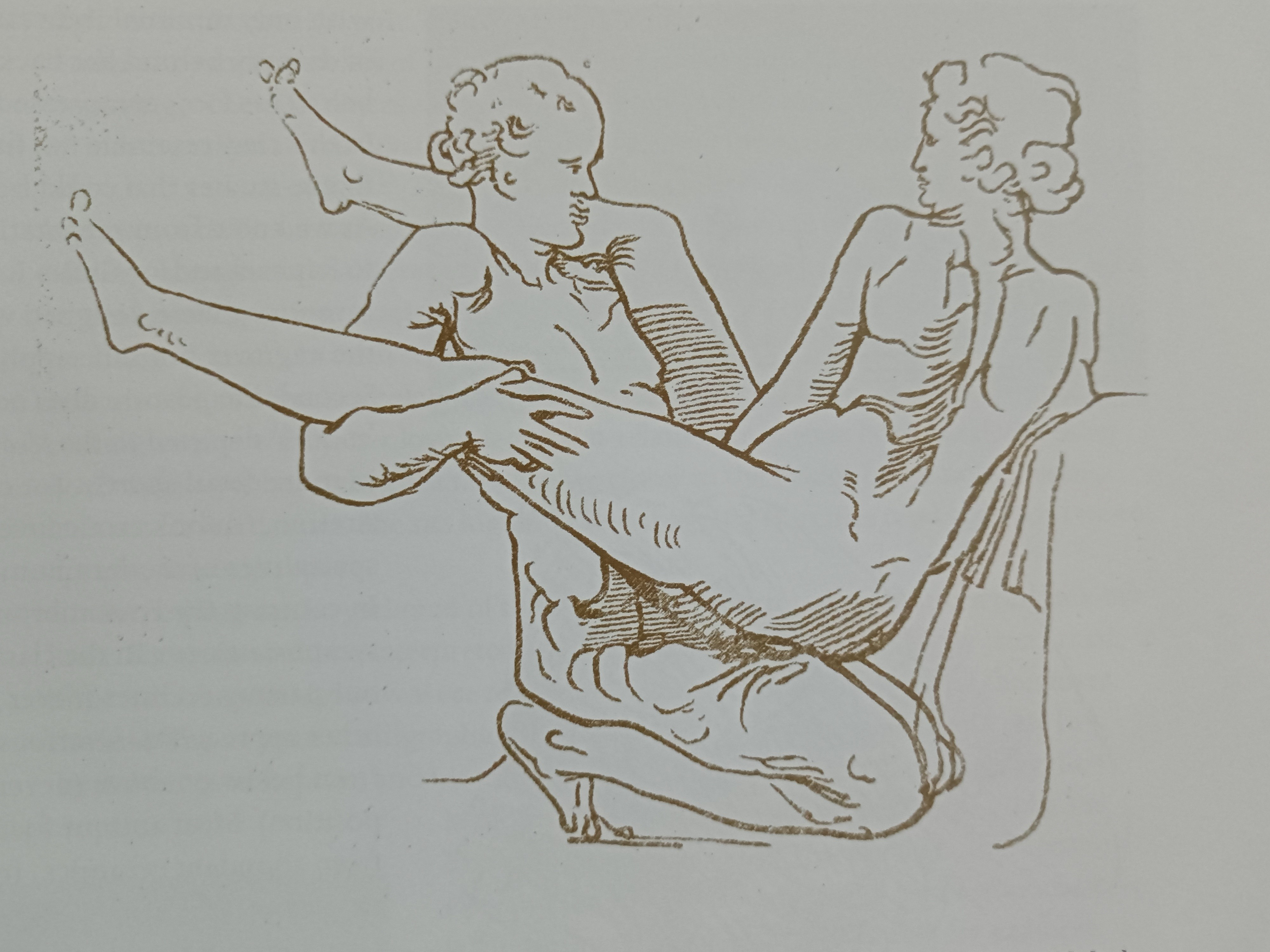
A second different drawing from the Fossombrone sketchbook. This drawing also shows sex between a female and a male.

=== Fresco cycle on the ceiling of the Farnese Gallery - Annibale Carracci and studio (Between 1597 and 1608) ===
Between 1597 and 1608 Annibale Carracci and his studio painted a fresco cycle on the ceiling of the Farnese Gallery which is located in the west wing of the Palazzo Farnese in Rome.

This fresco cycle is titled The Loves of the Gods and the images were drawn from Ovid's Metamorphoses. These frescos include nudes that are intimating sex between two people in contrast to the engravings in I modi.

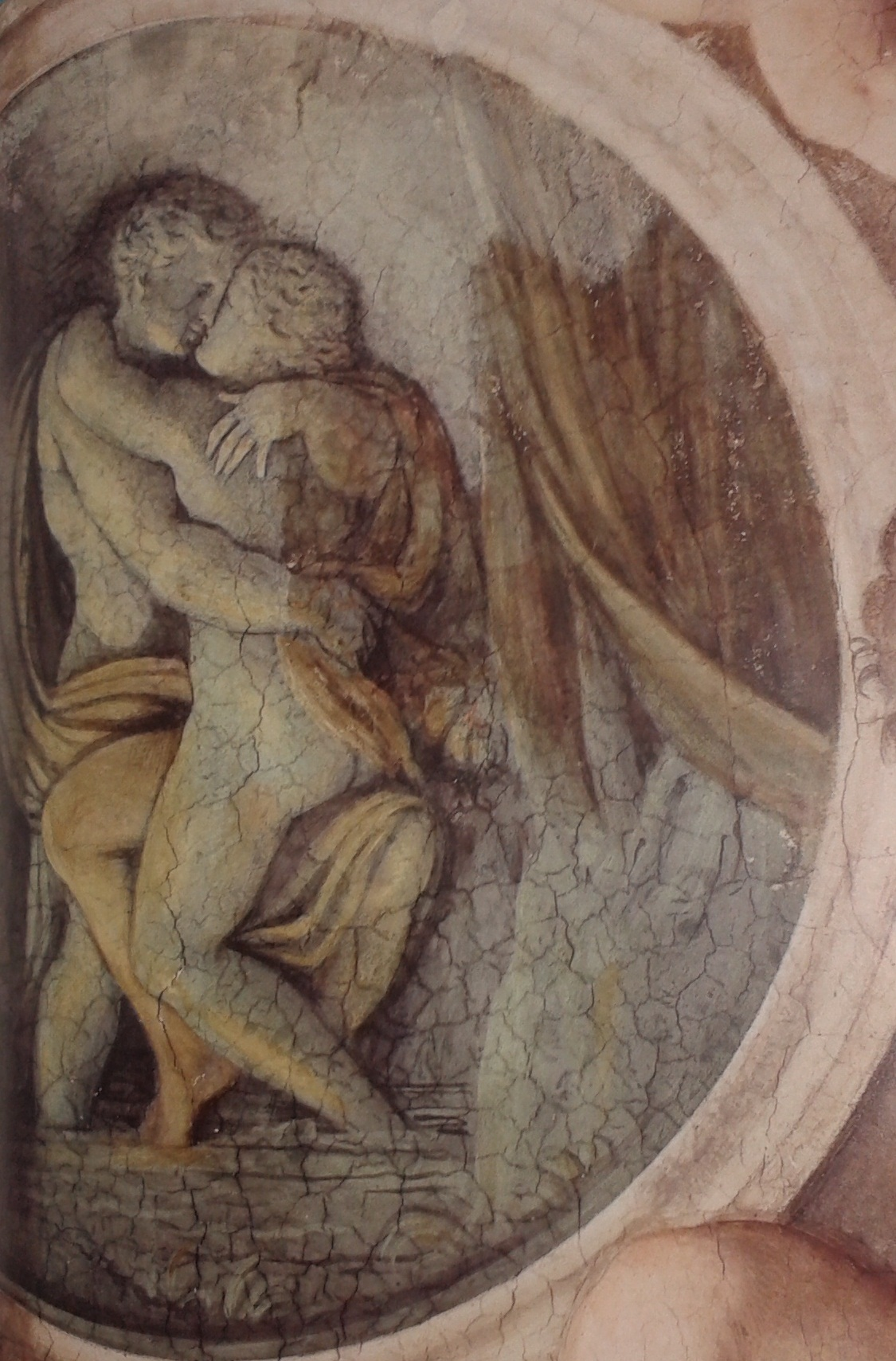
Painting from the fresco cycle Loves of the Gods. Annibale Carracci and studio. Palazzo Farnese, Rome. Between 1597 and 1608

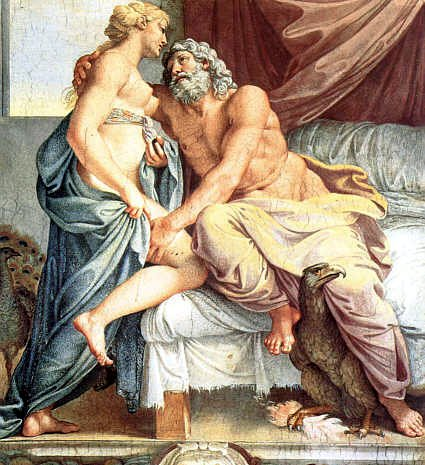
Jupiter and Juno. Painting from the fresco cycle Loves of the Gods. Annibale Carracci and studio. Palazzo Farnese, Rome. 1597 to 1608

=== Erotic art by Giulio Romano and Marcantonio Raimondi ===
Giulio Romano and Marcantonio Raimondi have both created erotic art outside of their collaboration on I modi. In the hall of Cupid and Psyche in Te Palace in Mantua, Romano created the fresco Jupiter seducing Olympia and it shows Jupiter with an erection approaching a reclining Olympia. In around 1520 to 1530 Romano created the painting The Lovers that shows an erotic scene between two figures on a bed and carved into a leg of the bed is an erotic scene between a female and a satyr. In around 1530 Romano also created a drawing of an erotic scene between a female and a male.

In around 1500 to 1505 Raimondi created a drawing of Leda and the Swan and in around 1510 he created a drawng of a female standing whilst holding a dildo next to her vagina.

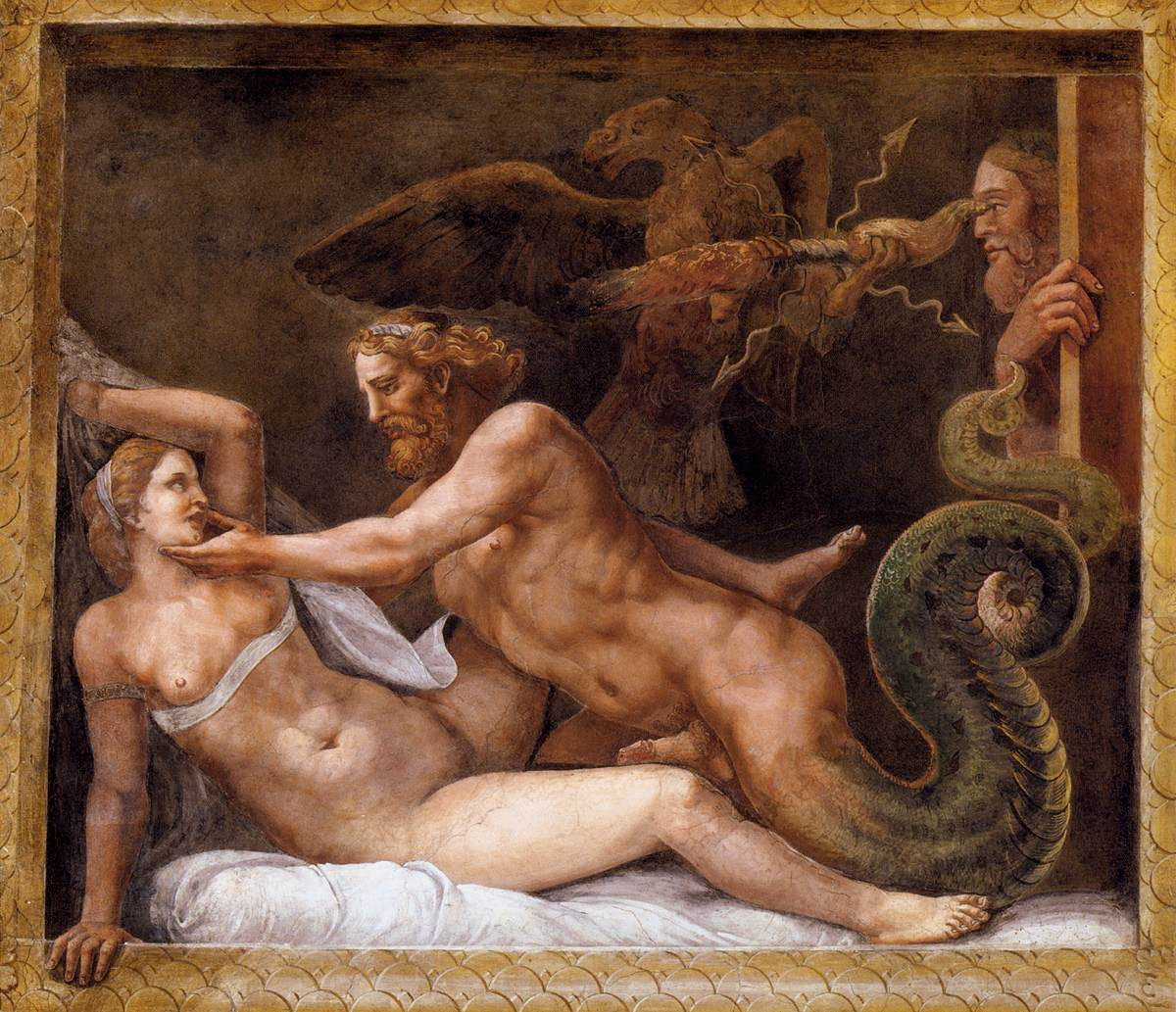
Jupiter seducing Olympia, Giulio Romano. Fresco. In the hall of cupid and Psyche in the Te palace in Mantua. Between 1526 and 1528

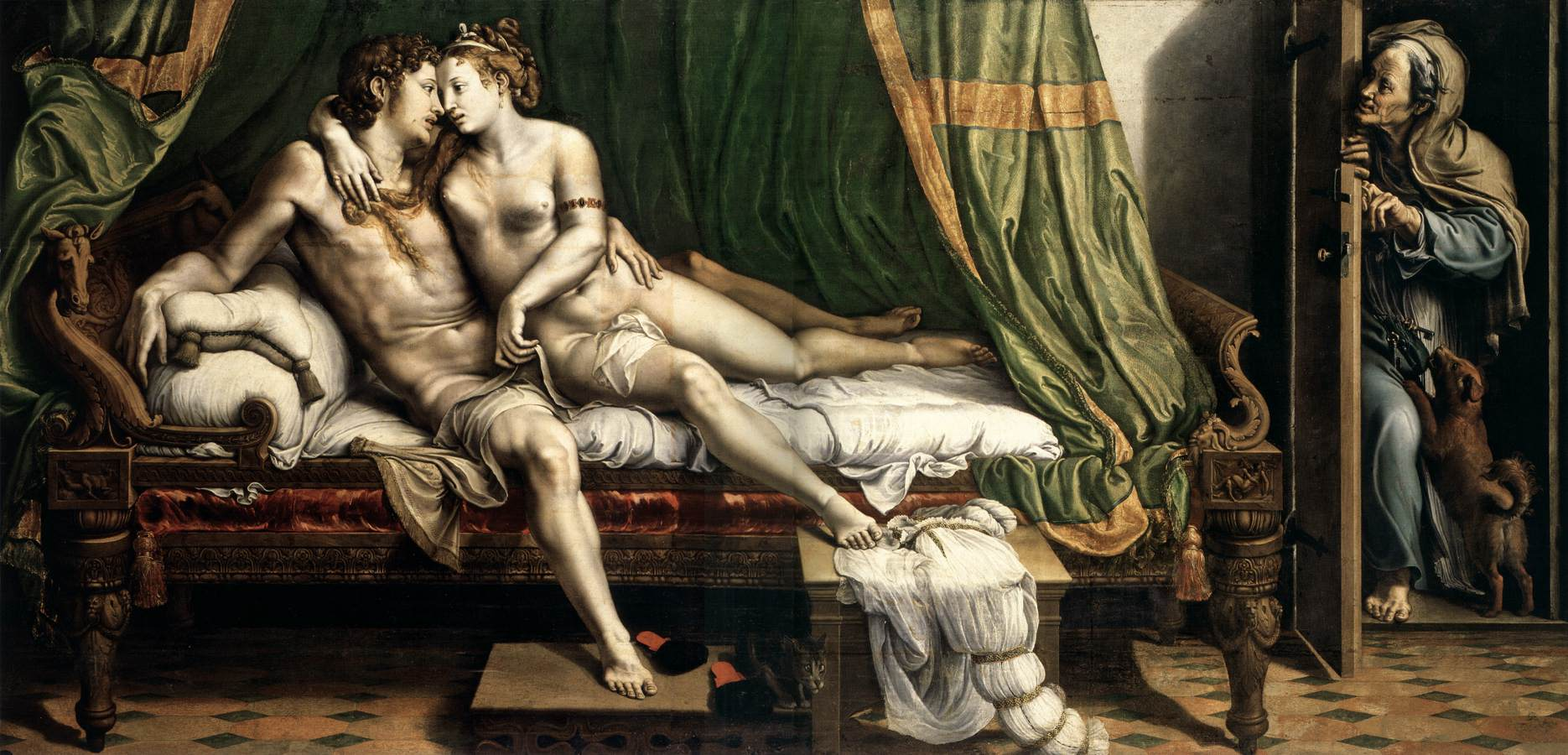
The Lovers, Giulio Romano. Oil painting. Hermitage Museum, Saint Petersburg. Around 1520 to 1530

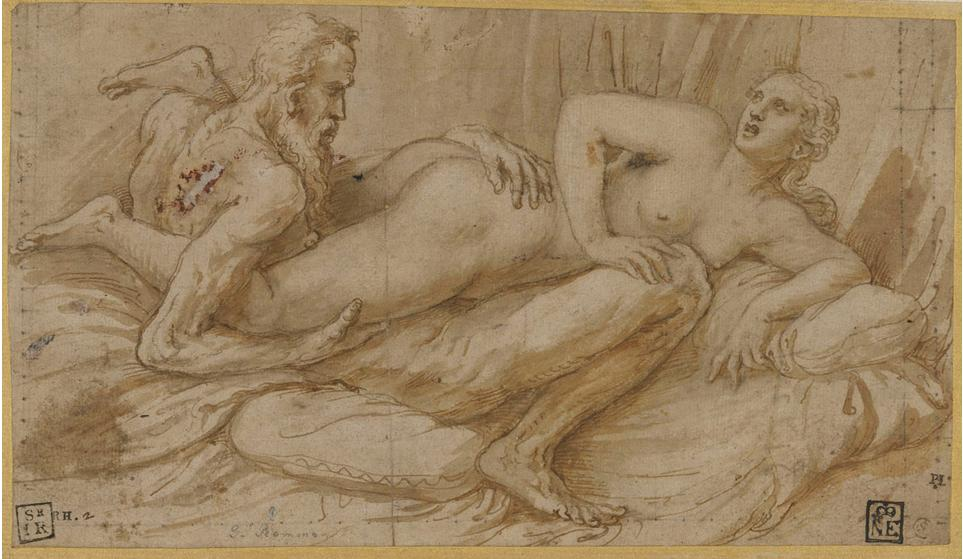
Erotic Scene, Giulio Romano. Pen and charcoal drawing. Museum of Fine Arts (Budapest). Around 1530

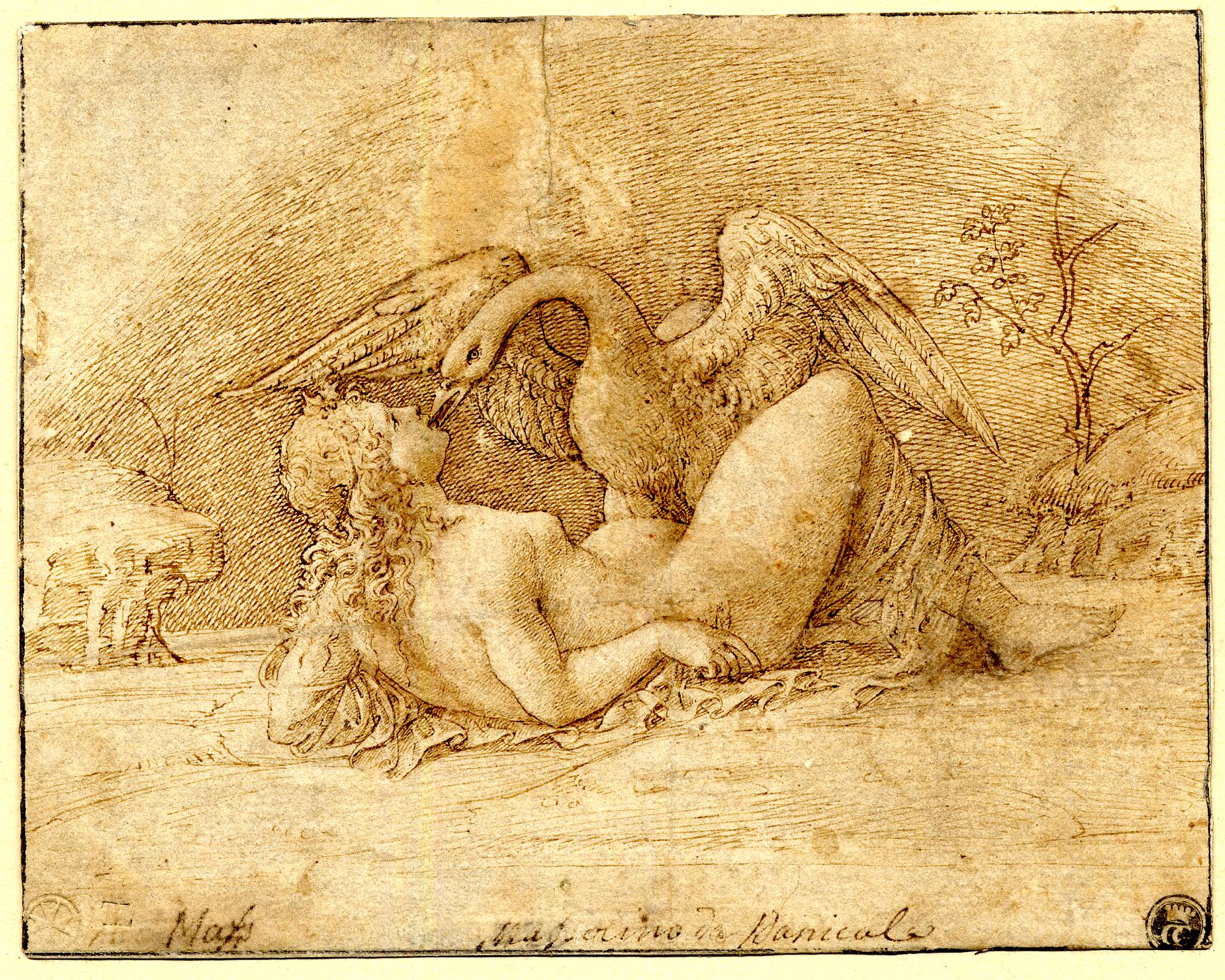
Leda and the Swan, Maracantonio Raimondi. Pen and chalk drawing. British Museum, London. 1500 to 1505

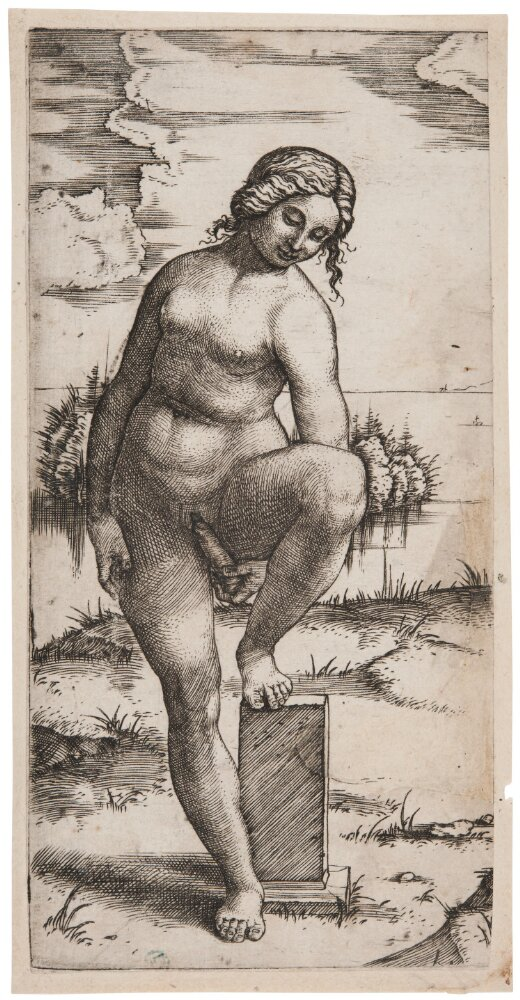
Standing woman with Artificial Phallus, Maracantonio Raimondi. Fragment of a copperplate engraving. Nationalmuseum, Stockholm. Around 1510?

=== Erotic Renaissance paintings in the 15th and 16th century ===
In around 1500 Jacopo de' Barbari created the painting the Naked Lovers that shows an erotic scene between two standing naked figures. In the first third of the 16th century Bernard van Orley created the painting Neptune and Nymph that shows sex between a Nymph and Neptune.

In the Schifanoia Palace in Ferrara, there is a hall titled the Hall of the Months and in this hall there is a fresco cycle described as "...a sort of large calendar" that combines scenes of ancient mythology with astrological scenes. One of these frescos titled the Allegory of April shows an erotic scene in the lower left hand corner. The frescos were created by Francesco del Cossa, Ercole de’ Roberti and Gherardo di Andrea Fiorini in around 1469.

In around 1470 the oil painting Love spell was created that shows a nude female inside a room dropping water into a chest that contains a large heart. At the rear of the room a second person is entering and is viewing the scene from a doorway. The painting is by an unknown lower Rhenish artist.

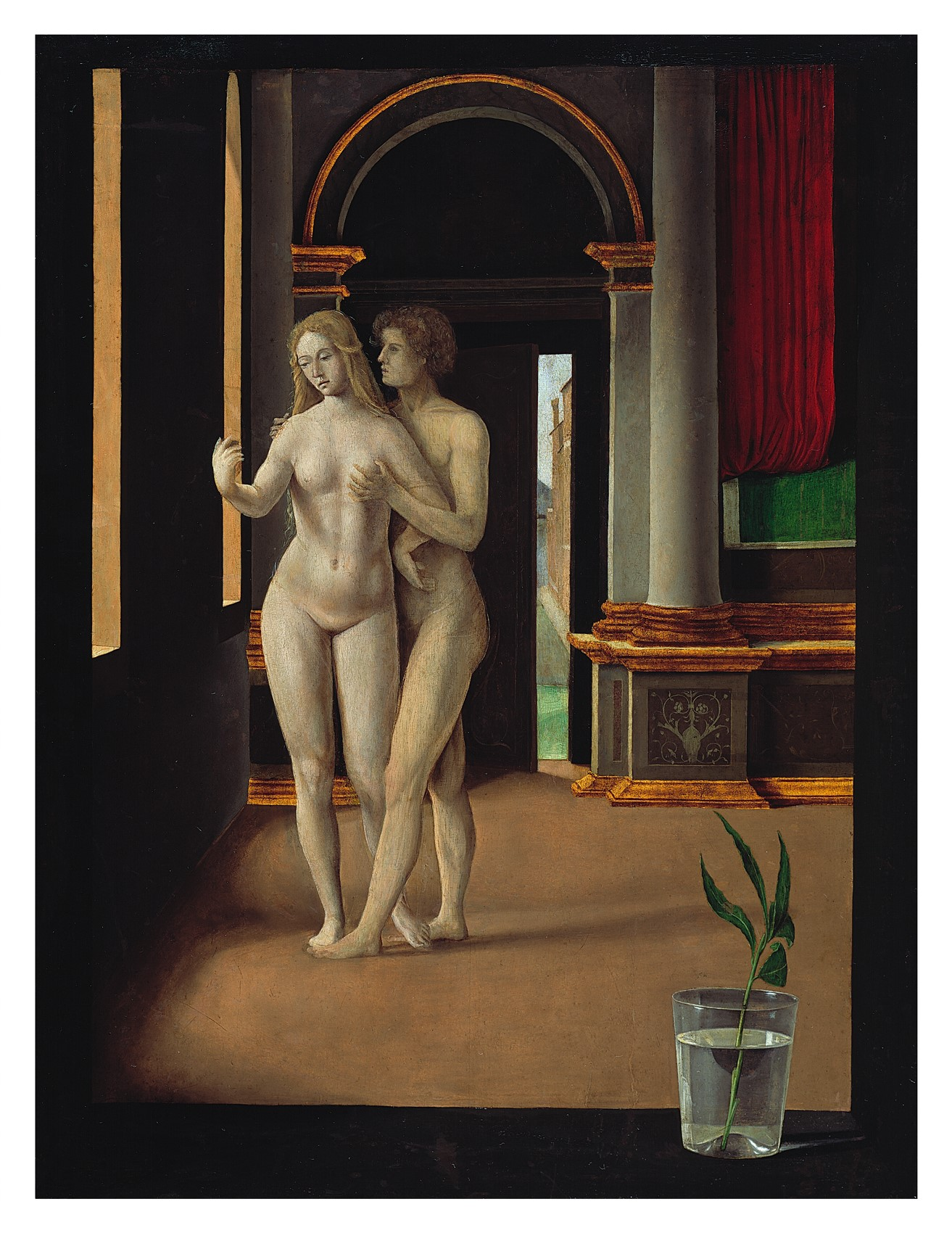
Naked lovers, Jacopo de' Barbari. Oil on poplar panel. State Museums, Berlin. Around 1500.

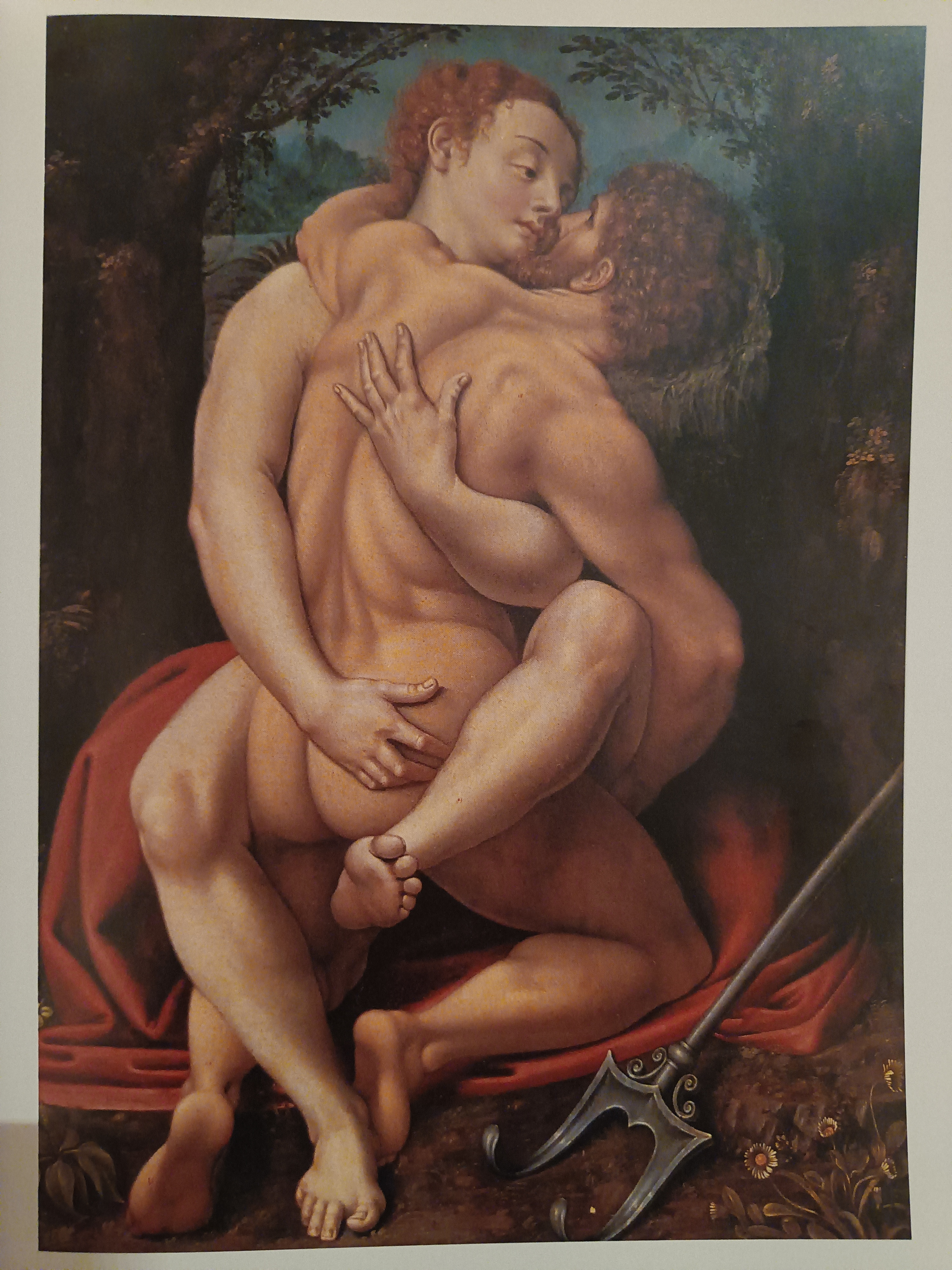
Neptune and Nymph. Bernard van Orley. Oil on panel. Private collection. First third of the 16th century.

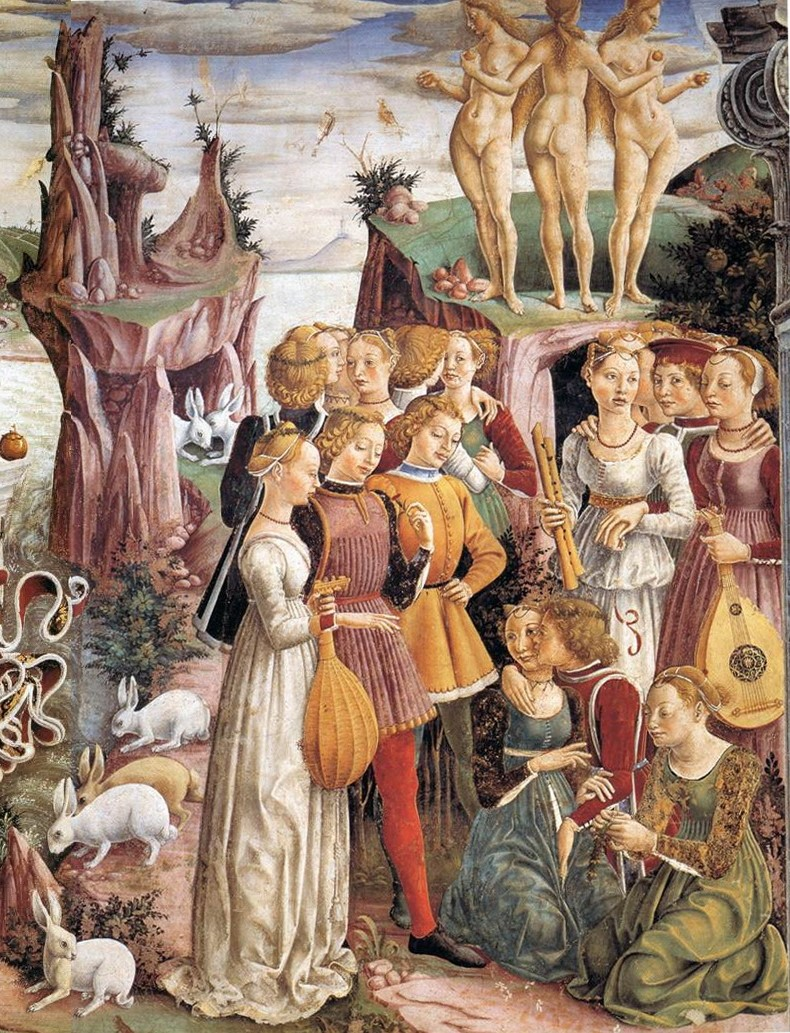
Allegory of April. A fresco in the Hall of the Months in the Schifanoia Palace, Ferrara. Francesco del Cossa, Ercole de’ Roberti and Gherardo di Andrea Fiorini. Around 1469

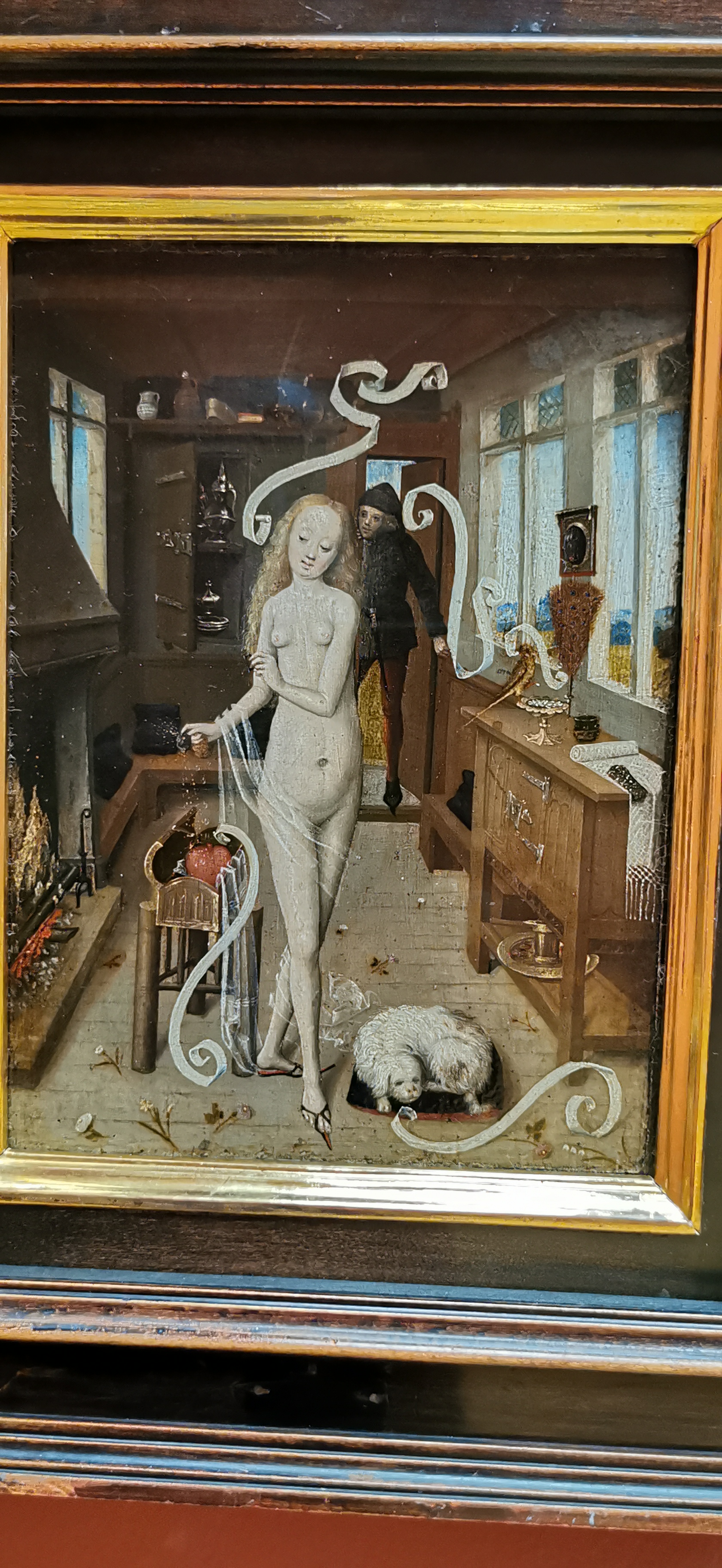
Love Spell. Artist: Unknown lower Rhenish artist. Oil on panel. Museum of Fine Arts, Leipzig. Around 1470

== Cultural references ==
The Restoration closet drama Farce of Sodom is set in "an antechamber hung with Aretine's postures". In the 1989 novel The Sixteen Pleasures by Robert Hellenga, a copy of the book is discovered in a convent following the 1966 flood of the Arno.

== See also ==
- History of erotic depictions
- Homosexuality in ancient Greece
- Homosexuality in ancient Rome
- Sexuality in ancient Rome

== Notes ==
- Talvacchia, Bette Taking Positions: On the Erotic in Renaissance Culture. Princeton University Press 1999; p. 250 ISBN 978-0691026329
