= 250s BC =

Decade

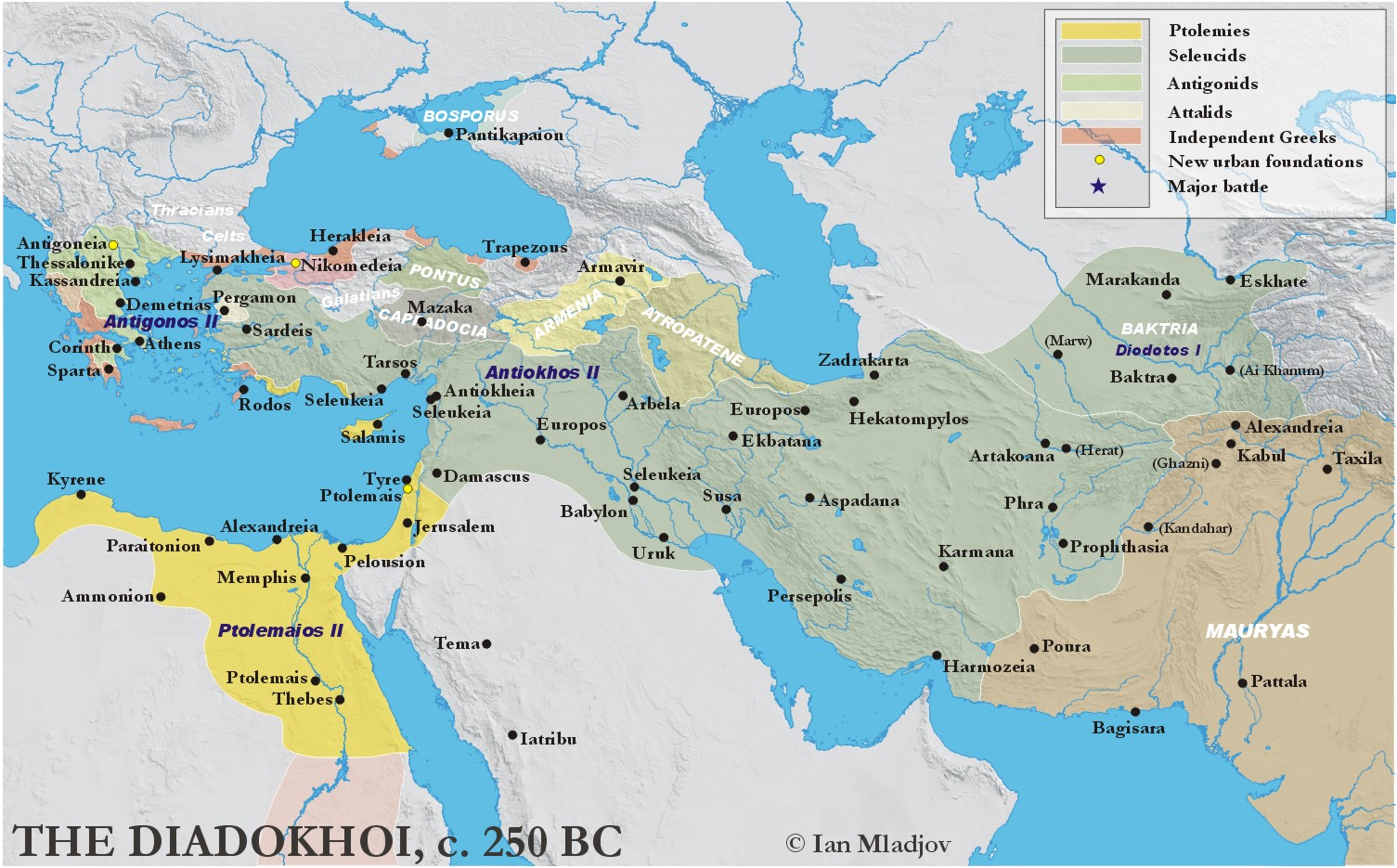
Map of the Hellenistic world 3rd century BCE (250 BC).

This article concerns the period 259 BC – 250 BC.

== Events ==
=== 259 BC ===
==== By place ====
====== Seleucid Empire ======
- The Seleucid king Antiochus II starts the Second Syrian War against Ptolemy II Philadelphus to avenge his father's losses. Antiochus II finds a willing ally in Antigonus II Gonatas, the king of Macedonia, who has been dealing with Ptolemy II's attempts to destabilize Macedonia.

====== Sicily ======
- The Carthaginians under Hamilcar take advantage of their victory at Thermae in Sicily by counterattacking the Romans and seizing Enna. Hamilcar continues south to Camarina, in Syracusan territory, to try to convince the Syracusans to rejoin the Carthaginian side.

====== China ======
- The State of Zhou cedes to the State of Qin the Han region of Yuanyong and six cities of Zhao in exchange for peace.

=== 258 BC ===
==== By place ====
====== Roman Republic ======
- The Romans are able to regain the initiative in Sicily against Carthage by retaking Enna and Camarina. In central Sicily, they take the town of Mytistraton, which they have attacked twice previously. The Romans also move in the north by marching across the northern coast toward Panormus, but are not able to take the city due to the city's heavily fortified walls.
- Gaius Duilius Nepos, the Roman commander who has won a major naval victory over the Carthaginians is made censor with Lucius Cornelius Scipio. The election of a novus homo (i.e. the first in his family to serve in the Roman Senate or be elected as consul) to the censorship is a very rare honor.

====== Egypt ======
- Ptolemy II loses control of the territory of Cyrenaica.
- Erasistratus of Ceos founds a medical school at Alexandria.

====== Greece ======
- The forces of the Macedonian King Antigonus II and the Seleucid King Antiochus II win a naval victory at Cos against their common enemy, Ptolemy II. This victory secures Antigonus control over the Aegean Sea and the League of the Islanders. It also diminishes Ptolemaic naval power.

====== China ======
- The State of Qin besieges Handan, the capital of the State of Zhou, but the Qin army under Wang Ling sustains heavy casualties. Wang Ling is then replaced by Wang He.
- The merchant Lu Buwei rescues the Qin prince Ying Yiren, a hostage at the Zhao court, from Handan. Ying Yiren will eventually become King Zhuangxiang of Qin.

====== Vietnam ======
- According to legend, the Hồng Bàng dynasty comes to an end.

=== 257 BC ===
==== By place ====
====== Roman Republic ======
- The Romans attack Sardinia and try to capture it from the Carthaginians.
- The Battle of Tyndaris is fought between the Roman fleet (with Gaius Atilius Regulus in command) and the Carthaginian fleet off Tyndaris (modern Tindari) in Sicily. Hiero II, tyrant of Syracuse, has allowed Tyndaris to be a base for the Carthaginians. However, after this battle, the town falls to Roman forces.

====== China ======
- The Qin siege of Handan, the capital of the State of Zhao:

- The State of Chu and the State of Wei send armies to assist Zhao against the Qin, and they defeat the Qin army of Wang He outside Handan. This forces Wang He to lift the siege.
- The Qin general Bai Qi is executed for his refusal to take command of the siege.

====== Vietnam ======
- Thục Phán (An Dương Vương), Chief of the Thục Tribe of the Âu Việts, defeats the Văn Lang Confederacy and unifies all Âu Việt and Lạc Việt tribes, thus founding the Kingdom of Âu Lạc and the Thục dynasty.

=== 256 BC ===
==== By place ====
====== Roman Republic ======
- Rome aims for a quick end to hostilities in the First Punic War and decides to invade the Carthaginian colonies in Northern Africa to force the enemy to accept terms. A major fleet is built, including transports for the army and its equipment, and warships for their protection. Carthage under Hamilcar tries to intervene but a force under the Roman general and consul Marcus Atilius Regulus and his colleague Lucius Manlius Vulso Longus defeat the Carthaginian fleet in the Battle of Cape Ecnomus off the southern coast of Sicily.

====== North Africa ======
- Following the Battle of Cape Ecnomus, the Romans land an army near Carthage (Tunesia, North Africa) and begin ravaging the Carthaginian countryside. The Roman army soon forces the capitulation of Clupea, a town 40 miles (64 kilometres) east of Carthage. After setting up Roman defenses for the city, the two consuls receive instructions from Rome that Vulso is to set sail for Rome, taking most of the fleet with him. Regulus, on the other hand, is to stay with the infantry and cavalry to finish the war.
- Marcus Atilius Regulus marches to Aspis and takes the town after a short siege.
- From their new base at Aspis the Romans march on towards Carthage; they encounter and defeat the Carthaginian army at the Battle of Adys.

====== China ======
- The Great Wall of China construction starts.
- Luoyang falls without much resistance to the armies of the Qin, ending the reign of the emperor Zhou Nan Wang. Although a successor was appointed as Dong Zhou Hui Wang, traditionally in Chinese history this is considered the end of the Zhou dynasty.
- The Du Jiang Yan Irrigation System is constructed, ending flooding and irrigating thousands of square miles of land through an ingeniously designed system.

=== 255 BC ===
==== By place ====
====== Roman Republic ======
- The Battle of Adis (or Adys) is fought near the city of that name, 40 miles (64 kilometres) southeast of Carthage, between Carthaginian forces and a Roman army led by Marcus Atilius Regulus. The Romans inflict a crushing defeat upon the Carthaginians, and the latter then sue for peace. The ensuing negotiations between the parties lead to Regulus demanding Carthage agree to an unconditional surrender, cede Sicily, Corsica and Sardinia to Rome, renounce the use of their navy, pay an indemnity, and sign a vassal-like treaty. These terms are so harsh that the people of Carthage resolve to keep fighting.
- The Carthaginians, angered by Regulus' demands, hire Xanthippus, a Spartan mercenary, to reorganize the army. The revitalised Carthaginian army, led by Xanthippus, decisively defeat the Romans in the Battle of Tunis and capture their commander Marcus Atilius Regulus. A Roman fleet, sent to rescue Regulus and his troops, is wrecked in a storm off Sicily.

====== Egypt ======
- In the Second Syrian War, Ptolemy II loses ground in Cilicia, Pamphylia, and Ionia, while Antiochus II regains Miletus and Ephesus. A peace is then concluded between Antiochus and Ptolemy under which Antiochus is to marry Ptolemy's daughter Berenice Syra.

====== Bactria ======
- Diodotus I, Seleucid satrap of Bactria, rebels against Antiochus II and becomes the founder of the Greco-Bactrian Kingdom.

====== China ======
- King Hui of Zhou becomes the last claimant king of the Zhou dynasty of China.

=== 254 BC ===
==== By place ====
====== Roman Republic ======
- A Roman army led by consuls Gnaeus Cornelius Scipio Asina and Aulus Atilius Calatinus capture Panormus in Sicily.
- The Romans lose control of the Sicilian city of Agrigentum to the Carthaginians.

=== 253 BC ===
==== By place ====
====== Seleucid Empire ======
- The second Syrian War between the Seleucids and the Ptolemies ends. Antiochus II regains much of Anatolia from Ptolemy II, including the cities of Miletus and Ephesus, and also the Phoenician coast.
- The war is concluded with the marriage of Antiochus to Ptolemy II's daughter, Berenice Syra. Antiochus divorces his previous wife, Laodice, and transfers the succession to Berenice's children.
- In recapturing the city of Miletus, Antiochus II overthrows the tyrant of the city. In response, the citizens worship him as a god in thanksgiving leading to the addition of Theos to Antiochus II's name.

====== Roman Republic ======
- A second Roman war fleet of 150 ships is wrecked on the voyage from Lilybaeum (in Sicily) to Rome.
- Tiberius Coruncanius is the first plebeian to be elected pontifex maximus of Rome.

====== Greece ======
- Alexander, Antigonus II's nephew and regent, leads a revolt in Corinth with Ptolemy II's help and declares himself an independent monarch. As a result, Antigonus loses Corinth and Chalcis, the two bases from which he has dominated southern Greece. As the Aetolians occupy Thermopylae, Antigonus II is cut off from Athens and the Peloponnese.
- Macedonia's involvement in the second Syrian War ceases when Antigonus becomes preoccupied with the rebellion of Corinth and Chalcis, as well as an increase in enemy activity along Macedon's northern frontier.

=== 252 BC ===
==== By place ====
====== Greece ======
- Abantidas, the tyrant of Sicyon, is murdered by his enemies and is succeeded by his father, Paseas.

=== 251 BC ===
==== By place ====
====== Greece ======
- Paseas, the tyrant of the Greek city-state of Sicyon, is assassinated by Nicocles, with the acquiescence of the Macedonian king Antigonus II. Nicocles reigns as tyrant of Sicyon for only four months, during which period he drives into exile eighty of the city's citizens. Then the citadel of Sicyon is surprised in the night by a party of Sicyonian exiles, headed by a young nobleman, Aratus. The palace of the tyrant is set on fire, but Nicocles escapes from the city through a subterranean passage.
- Aratus recalls back to Sicyon those exiled by Nicocles. This leads to confusion and division within the city. Fearing that Antigonus II will exploit these divisions to attack the city, Aratus applies for the city to join the Achaean League, a league of a few small Achaean towns in the Peloponnese. Aratus then gains the financial support of the Egyptian king Ptolemy II to enable the Achaean League to defend itself against Macedonia.

====== Roman Republic ======
- The Romans, led by Lucius Caecilius Metellus, attack the Carthaginian held port city of Panormus after taking Kephalodon. After fierce fighting in the Battle of Panormus, the Carthaginians, led by Hasdrubal (the Fair), are defeated and the city falls.
- With Panormus captured, much of western inland Sicily falls with it. The cities of Ieta, Solous, Petra and Tyndaris agree to peace with the Romans in the same year. This defeat marks the end of significant Carthaginian land-based campaigning in Sicily.

====== China ======
- The Zhao general Lian Po wins a decisive victory in battle over the State of Yan at Hao. He is promoted to Prime Minister following the death of Lord Pingyuan.

=== 250 BC ===
==== By place ====
====== Egypt ======
- According to the Letter of Aristeas, Ptolemy II invited the Jewish residents of Alexandria to have their torah translated into Greek. Because around seventy translators are used to achieve this, the translation is known as the Septuagint.
- Following the death of the King of Cyrene, Magas, Queen Apama II, Magas' widow, and Antigonus II arrange the marriage of Antigonus' half-brother Demetrius the Fair to Berenice of Cyrene, daughter of Magas and Apama. However, when Demetrius the Fair arrives, Apama becomes his lover. In response, Berenice leads an uprising in which Demetrius is killed in Apama's bedroom.

====== Roman Republic ======
- In the Punic War, the Romans shift their attention to the southwest of Sicily. They send a naval expedition toward the Carthaginian city of Lilybaeum. En route, the Romans seize and burn the Carthaginian held cities of Selinous and Heraclea Minoa. The Romans then begin the siege of Lilybaeum.
- According to tradition (Horace, Odes, iii. 5), after the defeat of the Carthaginians at the Battle of Panormus, the Carthaginians release Marcus Atilius Regulus from prison and he is sent to Rome on parole to negotiate a peace or an exchange of prisoners. However, on his arrival, he strongly urges the Roman Senate to refuse both proposals and continue fighting. After this he then honours his parole by returning to Carthage where he is executed by being placed in a spiked barrel, which is then let roll down a hill.

====== Persia ======
- Andragoras, a Seleucid satrap of the province of Partahia (Parthia), tries to gain independence from the Seleucid Kingdom under Antiochus II.

====== India ======
- According to the Theravāda commentaries and chronicles, the Third Buddhist Council is convened by the Mauryan king Ashoka at Pataliputra (modern Patna), under the leadership of the monk Moggaliputta Tissa. Its objective is to purify the Buddhist movement, particularly from opportunistic factions which are being attracted by the royal patronage.
- The Mauryan sculpture Didarganj Yakshi holding a Fly Whisk, from Patna, Bihar in India, is made (approximate date). It is now kept at the Patna Museum in Patna.
- The Mauryan Lion Capital of Ashoka, is erected as part of a pillar at Sarnath, Uttar Pradesh in India (approximate date). It is now preserved at the Sarnath Museum in Sarnath.

====== China ======
- Zichu becomes the king of Qin, with Lü Buwei his Prime Minister.
- The Qin general Meng Ao captures the Han cities of Chenggao and Xingyang, thereby establishing the Sanchuan Commandery.

== Births ==
259 BC

- February 18 – Qin Shi Huang, first emperor of China (d. 210 BC)
- Bashu Guafu Qing, Chinese businesswoman (d. 210 BC)

257 BC

- Aristophanes of Byzantium, Greek scholar and grammarian (approximate date)

256 BC

- Liu Bang, founder of the Han dynasty of China (d. 195 BC)

255 BC

- Xu Fu, ancient Chinese alchemist

254 BC

- Marcus Livius Salinator, Roman consul and commander during the Second Punic War
- Titus Macchius Plautus, Roman playwright who is credited with forming the foundations of modern comedy (d. 184 BC)

253 BC

- Zhang Cang, Chinese general and prime-minister (d. 152 BC)

252 BC

- Philopoemen, Greek general and statesman (d. 183 BC)

250 BC

- Agron, king of the Ardiaean Kingdom (approximate date)

== Deaths ==
257 BC

- Bai Qi, Chinese general of the Qin State (Warring States Period)

256 BC

- Zhou Nan Wang, Chinese king of the Zhou dynasty

254 BC

- Areus II, Agiad king of Sparta (son of Acrotatus II)

252 BC

- Abantidas, tyrant of Sicyon (assassinated)

251 BC

- Paseas, Greek tyrant of Sicyon (assassinated)
- King Zhaoxiang of Qin
- Zhao Sheng, Chinese chancellor of the Zhao State

250 BC

- Erasistratus, Greek anatomist and royal physician under Seleucus I Nicator of Syria. He has founded a school of anatomy in Alexandria (b. 310 BC)
- Gongsun Long, Chinese scholar and philosopher (b. c. 325 BC)
- Hieronymus of Cardia, Greek general and historian (b. 354 BC)
- Magas of Cyrene, king of Cyrenaica (modern Libya) (b. c. 320 BC)
- Marcus Atilius Regulus, Roman general and consul (executed)
- Timaeus, Greek historian who has studied rhetoric under a pupil of Socrates (b. c. 345 BC)
- Xiaowen of Qin, Chinese king of the Qin State (b. 302 BC)
- Zhaoxiang of Qin, Chinese king of the Qin State (b. 325 BC)
