= 251 BC =

251 BC in various calendars
Gregorian calendar	251 BC; CCLI BC
Ab urbe condita	503
Ancient Egypt era	XXXIII dynasty, 73
Pharaoh	Ptolemy II Philadelphus, 33
Ancient Greek Olympiad (summer)	132nd Olympiad, year 2
Assyrian calendar	4500
Balinese saka calendar	N/A
Bengali calendar	−844 – −843
Berber calendar	700
Buddhist calendar	294
Burmese calendar	−888
Byzantine calendar	5258–5259
Chinese calendar	己酉年 (Earth Rooster); 2447 or 2240 — to — 庚戌年 (Metal Dog); 2448 or 2241
Coptic calendar	−534 – −533
Discordian calendar	916
Ethiopian calendar	−258 – −257
Hebrew calendar	3510–3511
- Hindu calendars
Vikram Samvat	−194 – −193
Shaka Samvat	N/A
Kali Yuga	2850–2851
Holocene calendar	9750
Iranian calendar	872 BP – 871 BP
Islamic calendar	899 BH – 898 BH
Javanese calendar	N/A
Julian calendar	N/A
Korean calendar	2083
Minguo calendar	2162 before ROC 民前2162年
Nanakshahi calendar	−1718
Seleucid era	61/62 AG
Thai solar calendar	292–293
Tibetan calendar	阴土鸡年 (female Earth-Rooster) −124 or −505 or −1277 — to — 阳金狗年 (male Iron-Dog) −123 or −504 or −1276

Year 251 BC was a year of the pre-Julian Roman calendar. At the time it was known as the Year of the Consulship of Metellus and Pacilus (or, less frequently, year 503 Ab urbe condita). The denomination 251 BC for this year has been used since the early medieval period, when the Anno Domini calendar era became the prevalent method in Europe for naming years.

== Events ==
=== By place ===
==== Greece ====
- Paseas, the tyrant of the Greek city-state of Sicyon, is assassinated by Nicocles, with the acquiescence of the Macedonian king Antigonus II. Nicocles reigns as tyrant of Sicyon for only four months, during which period he drives into exile eighty of the city's citizens. Then the citadel of Sicyon is surprised in the night by a party of Sicyonian exiles, headed by a young nobleman, Aratus. The palace of the tyrant is set on fire, but Nicocles escapes from the city through a subterranean passage.
- Aratus recalls back to Sicyon those exiled by Nicocles. This leads to confusion and division within the city. Fearing that Antigonus II will exploit these divisions to attack the city, Aratus applies for the city to join the Achaean League, a league of a few small Achaean towns in the Peloponnese. Aratus then gains the financial support of the Egyptian king Ptolemy II to enable the Achaean League to defend itself against Macedonia.

==== Roman Republic ====
- The Romans, led by Lucius Caecilius Metellus, attack the Carthaginian held port city of Panormus after taking Kephalodon. After fierce fighting in the Battle of Panormus, the Carthaginians, led by Hasdrubal (the Fair), are defeated and the city falls.
- With Panormus captured, much of western inland Sicily falls with it. The cities of Ieta, Solous, Petra and Tyndaris agree to peace with the Romans in the same year. This defeat marks the end of significant Carthaginian land-based campaigning in Sicily.

==== China ====
- The Zhao general Lian Po wins a decisive victory in battle over the State of Yan at Hao. He is promoted to Prime Minister following the death of Lord Pingyuan.

== Deaths ==
- Paseas, Greek tyrant of Sicyon (assassinated)
- King Zhaoxiang of Qin
- Zhao Sheng, Chinese chancellor of the Zhao State
