= 250 BC =

250 BC in various calendars
Gregorian calendar	250 BC; CCL BC
Ab urbe condita	504
Ancient Egypt era	XXXIII dynasty, 74
Pharaoh	Ptolemy II Philadelphus, 34
Ancient Greek Olympiad (summer)	132nd Olympiad, year 3
Assyrian calendar	4501
Balinese saka calendar	N/A
Bengali calendar	−843 – −842
Berber calendar	701
Buddhist calendar	295
Burmese calendar	−887
Byzantine calendar	5259–5260
Chinese calendar	庚戌年 (Metal Dog); 2448 or 2241 — to — 辛亥年 (Metal Pig); 2449 or 2242
Coptic calendar	−533 – −532
Discordian calendar	917
Ethiopian calendar	−257 – −256
Hebrew calendar	3511–3512
- Hindu calendars
Vikram Samvat	−193 – −192
Shaka Samvat	N/A
Kali Yuga	2851–2852
Holocene calendar	9751
Iranian calendar	871 BP – 870 BP
Islamic calendar	898 BH – 897 BH
Javanese calendar	N/A
Julian calendar	N/A
Korean calendar	2084
Minguo calendar	2161 before ROC 民前2161年
Nanakshahi calendar	−1717
Seleucid era	62/63 AG
Thai solar calendar	293–294
Tibetan calendar	阳金狗年 (male Iron-Dog) −123 or −504 or −1276 — to — 阴金猪年 (female Iron-Pig) −122 or −503 or −1275

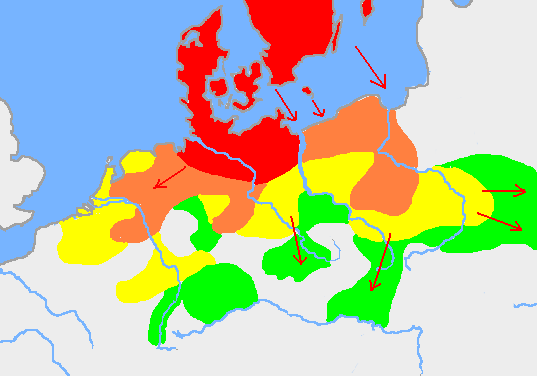
Germanic tribes in Europe in 250 BC (red, orange and yellow)

Year 250 BC was a year of the pre-Julian Roman calendar. At the time it was known as the Year of the Consulship of Regulus and Longus (or, less frequently, year 504 Ab urbe condita). The denomination 250 BC for this year has been used since the early medieval period, when the Anno Domini calendar era became the prevalent method in Europe for naming years.

== Events ==
=== By place ===
==== Egypt ====
- According to the Letter of Aristeas, Ptolemy II invited the Jewish residents of Alexandria to have their torah translated into Greek. Because around seventy translators are used to achieve this, the translation is known as the Septuagint.
- Following the death of the King of Cyrene, Magas, Queen Apama II, Magas' widow, and Antigonus II arrange the marriage of Antigonus' half-brother Demetrius the Fair to Berenice of Cyrene, daughter of Magas and Apama. However, when Demetrius the Fair arrives, Apama becomes his lover. In response, Berenice leads an uprising in which Demetrius is killed in Apama's bedroom.

==== Roman Republic ====
- In the Punic War, the Romans shift their attention to the southwest of Sicily. They send a naval expedition toward the Carthaginian city of Lilybaeum. En route, the Romans seize and burn the Carthaginian held cities of Selinous and Heraclea Minoa. The Romans then begin the siege of Lilybaeum.
- According to tradition (Horace, Odes, iii. 5), after the defeat of the Carthaginians at the Battle of Panormus, the Carthaginians release Marcus Atilius Regulus from prison and he is sent to Rome on parole to negotiate a peace or an exchange of prisoners. However, on his arrival, he strongly urges the Roman Senate to refuse both proposals and continue fighting. After this he then honours his parole by returning to Carthage where he is executed by being placed in a spiked barrel, which is then let roll down a hill.

==== Persia ====
- Andragoras, a Seleucid satrap of the province of Partahia (Parthia), tries to gain independence from the Seleucid Kingdom under Antiochus II.

==== India ====
- According to the Theravāda commentaries and chronicles, the Third Buddhist Council is convened by the Mauryan king Ashoka at Pataliputra (modern Patna), under the leadership of the monk Moggaliputta Tissa. Its objective is to purify the Buddhist movement, particularly from opportunistic factions which are being attracted by the royal patronage.
- The Mauryan sculpture Didarganj Yakshi holding a Fly Whisk, from Patna, Bihar in India, is made (approximate date). It is now kept at the Patna Museum in Patna.
- The Mauryan Lion Capital of Ashoka, is erected as part of a pillar at Sarnath, Uttar Pradesh in India (approximate date). It is now preserved at the Sarnath Museum in Sarnath.

==== China ====
- Zichu becomes the king of Qin, with Lü Buwei his Prime Minister.
- The Qin general Meng Ao captures the Han cities of Chenggao and Xingyang, thereby establishing the Sanchuan Commandery.

== Births ==
- Agron, king of the Ardiaean Kingdom (approximate date)

== Deaths ==
- Erasistratus, Greek anatomist and royal physician under Seleucus I Nicator of Syria. He has founded a school of anatomy in Alexandria (b. 310 BC)
- Gongsun Long, Chinese scholar and philosopher (b. c. 325 BC)
- Hieronymus of Cardia, Greek general and historian (b. 354 BC)
- Magas of Cyrene, king of Cyrenaica (modern Libya) (b. c. 320 BC)
- Marcus Atilius Regulus, Roman general and consul (executed)
- Timaeus, Greek historian who has studied rhetoric under a pupil of Socrates (b. c. 345 BC)
- Xiaowen of Qin, Chinese king of the Qin State (b. 302 BC)
- Zhaoxiang of Qin, Chinese king of the Qin State (b. 325 BC)
