= Glycera (given name) =

Glycera, Glyceria (Ancient Greek: Γλυκέρα, Γλυκερία) ("the sweet one") - female name of Greek origin:

- Glycera (courtesan) - popular name often used for Hellenistic hetaerae, held by:
  - The daughter of Thalassis and the mistress of Harpalus and Menander. (Athen. xiii. pp. 586, 595, 605, &c.)
  - The mistress of Pausias, born in Sicyon.
  - A favourite of Horace^{(?)}. (Hor. Carm. i. 19. 30. iii. 19.29.)
  - Nominally, Alcibiades's sexual partner in Caracci's engravings for I Modi.

== Other ==
- Glyceria (name)
- Glykeria (b. 1953) - Greek singer

== See also ==
- Glycera (disambiguation)
- Glyceria, a genus of grasses
