= 252 BC =

252 BC in various calendars
Gregorian calendar	252 BC; CCLII BC
Ab urbe condita	502
Ancient Egypt era	XXXIII dynasty, 72
Pharaoh	Ptolemy II Philadelphus, 32
Ancient Greek Olympiad (summer)	132nd Olympiad (victor)¹
Assyrian calendar	4499
Balinese saka calendar	N/A
Bengali calendar	−845 – −844
Berber calendar	699
Buddhist calendar	293
Burmese calendar	−889
Byzantine calendar	5257–5258
Chinese calendar	戊申年 (Earth Monkey); 2446 or 2239 — to — 己酉年 (Earth Rooster); 2447 or 2240
Coptic calendar	−535 – −534
Discordian calendar	915
Ethiopian calendar	−259 – −258
Hebrew calendar	3509–3510
- Hindu calendars
Vikram Samvat	−195 – −194
Shaka Samvat	N/A
Kali Yuga	2849–2850
Holocene calendar	9749
Iranian calendar	873 BP – 872 BP
Islamic calendar	900 BH – 899 BH
Javanese calendar	N/A
Julian calendar	N/A
Korean calendar	2082
Minguo calendar	2163 before ROC 民前2163年
Nanakshahi calendar	−1719
Seleucid era	60/61 AG
Thai solar calendar	291–292
Tibetan calendar	阳土猴年 (male Earth-Monkey) −125 or −506 or −1278 — to — 阴土鸡年 (female Earth-Rooster) −124 or −505 or −1277

Year 252 BC was a year of the pre-Julian Roman calendar. At the time it was known as the Year of the Consulship of Cotta and Geminus (or, less frequently, year 502 Ab urbe condita). The denomination 252 BC for this year has been used since the early medieval period, when the Anno Domini calendar era became the prevalent method in Europe for naming years.

== Events ==
=== By place ===
==== Greece ====
- Abantidas, the tyrant of Sicyon, is murdered by his enemies and is succeeded by his father, Paseas.

== Births ==
- Philopoemen, Greek general and statesman (d. 183 BC)

== Deaths ==
- Abantidas, tyrant of Sicyon (assassinated)
