= Pamphilus (painter) =

Macedonian painter

Pamphilus of Amphipolis (Ancient Greek: Πάμφιλος, fourth century BC) was a Macedonian painter and head of Sicyonian school. Under his influence painting became a regular part of Greek classical education, and a number of his pupils went on to become well-known painters.

== Career ==
Pamphilus was the disciple of Eupompus, the founder of the Sicyonian school of painting, and worked to establish this school. Of his own works we have mostly scanty accounts; but he was well known and respected as a teacher of his style of art. Among those who paid price for his tuition were Melanthius, Pausias and Apelles the painter of Alexander the Great.

According to Pliny, Pamphilus was an educated man, both in literacy and mathematics. He promoted the importance of education to the development of skilful painting.

== Legacy ==
The prominence of Pamphilus' school of painting contributed to the acceptance of painting as important to the education of noble youth. His ideas about the incorporation of mathematical skills in painting were quoted centuries later as evidence that painting was a science.

== Sources ==
- The Ancient Library - Pamphilus (Dictionary of Greek and Roman Biography and Mythology)
- Chisholm, Hugh, ed. (1911). "Pamphilus, a Greek painter of the 4th century" . Encyclopædia Britannica (11th ed.). Cambridge University Press.
- Kehayas Gounaris, Ioannis (2016). Πάμφιλος ὁ Ἀμφιπολίτης - Pamphilus the Amphipolitan. Σέρρες. ISBN 978-960-88423-8-0.
