= Mnasitheus of Sicyon =

Mnasitheus or Mnesitheus of Sicyon (Greek: Μνησίθεος) was an ancient Greek painter of some fame mentioned by Pliny the Elder in his Natural History.

In 251 BC, a Sicyonian of the same name helped Aratus of Sicyon to liberate his hometown from the tyrant Nicocles, and since Aratus was surrounded by many artists, there is a possibility that this man was the painter mentioned by Pliny or at least a relative.
