= Ageladas =

6th or 5th-century BC Greek sculptor

Ageladas /ˌædʒəˈleɪdəs/ (Ancient Greek: Ἀγελάδας Agelā́dās) or Hagelaedas /ˌhædʒəˈliːdəs/ (Ancient Greek: Ἁγελᾴδας Hagelā́idās) was a celebrated Greek (Argive) sculptor, who flourished in the latter part of the 6th and the early part of the 5th century BC.

Ageladas' fame is enhanced by his having been the instructor of the three great masters, Phidias, Myron, and Polykleitos. The determination of the period when Ageladas flourished has given rise to a great deal of discussion, owing to the apparently contradictory statements of the writers who mention his name. Pausanias states that Ageladas cast a statue of Cleosthenes (who gained a victory in the chariot-race in the 66th Olympiad) with the chariot, horses, and charioteer placed at Olympia.

Also at Olympia, there were statues by Ageladas of Timasitheus of Delphi and Anochus of Tarentum. Timasitheus was put to death by the Athenians for his participation in the attempt to overthrow the tyrant Isagoras during the 68th Olympiad in 507. According to Eusebius, Anochus was a victor in the games of the 65th Olympiad. Therefore, if Ageladas was born about 540, he may very well have been the instructor of Phidias. On the other hand, Pliny says that Ageladas, with Polykleitos, Phradmon, and Myron, flourished in the 87th Olympiad. This agrees with the statement of the scholiast on Aristophanes, that at Melite there was a statue of Heracles (Ἡρακλῆς ἀλεξίκακος), the work of Ageladas the Argive, which was set up during the great pestilence at the 87th Olympiad.

To these authorities must be added a passage of Pausanias, where he speaks of a statue of Zeus made by Ageladas for the Messenians of Naupactus. This must have been after the year 455, when the Messenians were allowed by the Athenians to settle at Naupactus.

In order to reconcile these conflicting statements, it has been argued that Pliny's date is wrong and that the statue of Heracles had been made by Ageladas long before it was set up at Melite. Other scholars think that Pliny's date is correct, but that Ageladas did not make the statues of the Olympic victors mentioned by Pausanias until many years after their victories. Given that the dates of those individuals' victories are so nearly the same, this could be argued as being a very extraordinary coincidence.

The most probable solution of the difficulty is that proposed by Friedrich Thiersch, who thinks that there were two artists of this name: one an Argive, the instructor of Phidias, born about 540; the other a native of Sicyon, who flourished at the date assigned by Pliny and was confused by the scholiast on Aristophanes with his more illustrious Argive namesake. Thiersch supports this hypothesis by an able criticism of a passage of Pausanias.

Other scholars assume that there were two artists with the name of Ageladas, but both were Argives. Ageladas the Argive executed one of a group of three Muses, representing respectively the presiding geniuses of the diatonic, chromatic and enharmonic styles of Greek music. Canachus and Aristocles of Sicyon made the other two.

He may have been the teacher of the sculptor Ascarus.
