= Aristocles (sculptors) =

Several ancient Greek artists

Aristocles (Ancient Greek: Ἀριστοκλῆς, Aristoklēs) is a name attributed to two sculptors in Ancient Greece, as well as a nominal hereditary school of sculpture, started by the elder Aristocles, known to us primarily through different passages in Pausanias.

- Aristocles of Cydonia was one of the most ancient sculptors; and though his age cannot be clearly fixed, it is certain that he flourished before Zancle was called Messene. That is, before 494 BC. He was called both a Cydonian and a Sicyonian, probably because he was born at Cydonia and practiced and taught his art in Sicyon.
- Aristocles of Sicyon was the grandson of the above, as well as the pupil and son of Cleoetas, and brother of Canachus. He was not much inferior to his father in reputation. This Aristocles had a pupil, Synnoön, who was the father and teacher of Ptolichus of Aegina. We are also told, in an epigram by Antipater Sidonius that this Aristocles made one of three statues of the Muses, the other two of which were made by Ageladas and Canachus.

From these passages we infer that these artists founded a school of sculpture at Sicyon, which secured a hereditary reputation, and of which we have the heads for seven generations, namely, Aristocles the elder, Cleoetas, Aristocles the younger and Canachus, Synnoön, Ptolichus, Sostratus, and Pantias.

There is some difficulty in determining the age of these artists; but, supposing the date of Canachus to be fixed at about 540—508 BC, we have the date of his brother, the younger Aristocles, and allowing 30 years to a generation, the elder Aristocles must have lived about 600—568 BC. Some scholars place him immediately before the period when Zancle was first called Messene, but there is nothing in the words of Pausanias to require such a restriction. By extending the calculation to the other artists mentioned above, we get the following table of dates:

1. Aristocles, flourished 600 to 568 BC
2. Cleoetas, flourished 570—538 BC
3. Aristocles & Canachus, flourished 540-508 BC
4. Synnoön, flourished 510—478 BC
5. Ptolichus, flourished 480—448 BC
6. Sostratus, flourished 450—418 BC
7. Pantias, flourished 420—388 BC

These dates are found to agree very well with all that we know of the artists. Karl Julius Sillig gives a table which does not materially differ from the above. He calculates the dates at 564, 536, 508, 480, 452, 424, and 396 BC respectively. In this computation, it has been assumed that the elder Canachus was the brother of the younger Aristocles, and that Pantias was the seventh in order from the elder Aristocles. Any other supposition would throw the whole matter into confusion.

Pausanias mentions, as a work of the elder Aristocles, a group in bronze representing Heracles struggling for a girdle with an Amazon on horseback, which was dedicated at Olympia by Evagoras of Zancle; and, as a work of the younger, a group in bronze of Zeus and Ganymede, dedicated at Olympia by Gnothis, a Thessalian. The Muse by the latter, mentioned above, was in bronze, held a lyre (χέλυς), and was intended to represent the Muse of the diatonic genus of music.
