= Alexis (sculptor) =

Ancient Greek sculptor

Alexis (Ancient Greek: Ἄλεξις) was an ancient Greek sculptor mentioned by Pliny as one of the pupils of Polykleitos. Pausanias mentions an artist of the same name, a native of Sicyon, and father of the sculptor Cantharus. It cannot be satisfactorily settled whether these are the same, or different persons. Pliny's account implies that he had the elder Polykleitos in mind, in which case Alexis could not have flourished later than Olympiad 95 in 400 BC, whereas Eutychides, under whom Cantharus studied, flourished about Olympiad 120 in 300. If the two were identical, as German classicist Friedrich Thiersch thinks, we must suppose either that Pliny made a mistake, and that Alexis studied instead under Polykleitos the Younger, or else that Eutychides, whose date is given by Pliny, was not the artist under whom Cantharus studied.
