= 247 BC =

247 BC in various calendars
- Gregorian calendar: 247 BC; CCXLVII BC
- Ab urbe condita: 507
- Ancient Egypt era: XXXIII dynasty, 77
- Pharaoh: Ptolemy II Philadelphus, 37
- Ancient Greek Olympiad (summer): 133rd Olympiad, year 2
- Assyrian calendar: 4504
- Balinese saka calendar: N/A
- Bengali calendar: −840 – −839
- Berber calendar: 704
- Buddhist calendar: 298
- Burmese calendar: −884
- Byzantine calendar: 5262–5263
- Chinese calendar: 癸丑年 (Water Ox); 2451 or 2244 — to — 甲寅年 (Wood Tiger); 2452 or 2245
- Coptic calendar: −530 – −529
- Discordian calendar: 920
- Ethiopian calendar: −254 – −253
- Hebrew calendar: 3514–3515
- Hindu calendars
- Vikram Samvat: −190 – −189
- Shaka Samvat: N/A
- Kali Yuga: 2854–2855
- Holocene calendar: 9754
- Iranian calendar: 868 BP – 867 BP
- Islamic calendar: 895 BH – 894 BH
- Javanese calendar: N/A
- Julian calendar: N/A
- Korean calendar: 2087
- Minguo calendar: 2158 before ROC 民前2158年
- Nanakshahi calendar: −1714
- Seleucid era: 65/66 AG
- Thai solar calendar: 296–297
- Tibetan calendar: ཆུ་མོ་གླང་ལོ་ (female Water-Ox) −120 or −501 or −1273 — to — ཤིང་ཕོ་སྟག་ལོ་ (male Wood-Tiger) −119 or −500 or −1272

Year 247 BC was a year of the pre-Julian Roman calendar. At the time it was known as the Year of the Consulship of Metellus and Buteo (or, less frequently, year 507 Ab urbe condita). The denomination 247 BC for this year has been used since the early medieval period, when the Anno Domini calendar era became the prevalent method in Europe for naming years.

== Events ==
=== By place ===
==== Carthage ====
- In Numidia Carthaginian general Hanno conquered the city of Theveste (nicknamed: Hekatompylos) after which he negotiated a peace settlement with the Numidians ending Carthage's war with the Numidians. He was praised by both parties for the fairness of the treaty.
- By this stage in the Punic War, Carthage has lost to Rome all its Sicilian possessions except Lilybaeum (now Marsala) and Drepanum (now Trapani). In the winter of 248/7, Hamilcar Barca takes over the chief command of the Carthaginian forces in Sicily at a time when the island is almost completely in the hands of the Romans. Landing on the north-west of the island with a small mercenary force, he seizes a strong position on Mount Ercte (Monte Pellegrino, near Palermo), and not only successfully defends himself against all attacks, but also carries his raids as far as the coast of southern Italy.

==== China ====
- General Wang He of the State of Qin takes the city of Shangdang from the State of Zhao and establishes Taiyuan Commandery.
- After suffering an initial defeat to Wei general Wuji in the Battle of Hewai, the armies of Qin, led by Meng Ao and Wang He, defeat a combined attempt by the other kingdoms of China to break through the strategic Hangu Pass and invade the Qin heartland of Guanzhong.
- The 13-year-old Ying Zheng, later called Qin Shi Huang, succeeds his father Zhuangxiang of Qin (Zichu) on the throne. Prime Minister Lü Buwei becomes the regent of the king.

== Births ==
- Hannibal Barca, Carthaginian military commander (d. c. 183 BC)

== Deaths ==
- Alexander of Corinth, Macedonian Greek governor and tyrant
- Moggaliputta-Tissa, Indian Buddhist monk and philosopher
- Zhuangxiang of Qin, Chinese king of the Qin State (b. 281 BC)
