= Deinias of Argos =

3rd-century BC Greek writer

Deinias of Argos (Ancient Greek: Δεινίας) was an ancient Greek philosopher and historian of the 3rd century BC. In 252 BC he joined with Aristotle the Dialectician in an attempt to overthrow the rule of the tyrant Abantidas of Sicyon. The two philosophers killed Abantidas during a public debate, but the tyrant's father Paseas took control of the situation and expelled the rebels. Deinias went into exile in Argos where he wrote an important History of Argos which probably ended with the death of the tyrant Aristippus of Argos in 235 BC.
