= Cleon of Sicyon =

3rd-century BCE tyrant of Sicyon

Cleon (/ˈkliːɒn, -ən/; Greek: Κλέων Kleon, Ancient Greek: [kléɔːn]) was a tyrant of the ancient Greek city-state of Sicyon from c. 300 to c. 280 BCE. According to Plutarch, he was assassinated and Timocleidas and Cleinias were made chief magistrates. According to Pausanias, Cleon was succeeded by Euthydemus and Timocleidas who ruled jointly as tyrants.
