= Aristolaos =

Aristolaos (Greek: Ἀριστόλαος, 350? BC) was a Greek painter of high caliber who lived in Sicyon, and who was the son and pupil of the painter Pausias.

According to Pliny he was a very austere painter. He tried to improve the work of his father, The Sacrifice of Oxen. Works by Aristolaos include Theseus, Pericles, Epaminondas, Medea, and Attic Demos.
