= Glycera =

Glycera may refer to:

- Glycera (annelid), genus of bloodworm
- Glycera (given name)
- Glycera (courtesan), popular name for Hellenistic courtesans
