= Aristotle the Dialectician =

3rd-century BC Greek philosopher

Aristotle the Dialectician (or Aristoteles of Argos, Greek: Ἀριστοτέλης; fl. 3rd century BC) was an ancient Greek philosopher from Argos who was a member of the Dialectical school.

According to Plutarch, he contrived a plot together with the historian Deinias of Argos to overthrow the tyranny in Sicyon in 252 BC. Although they successfully killed the tyrant, Abantidas, their further plans were thwarted by the tyrant's father Paseas, who took control of the city. Deinias managed to escape to Argos, but Aristotle's fate is uncertain. In 224 a friend of Aratus of Sicyon named Aristotle belonged to the party at Argos which revolted against Cleomenes III of Sparta, leading the city back into the Achaean League. Although it cannot be excluded that this was the same person, it appears more probable that this Aristotle was a son or a relative of the dialectician.
