= 248 (disambiguation) =

248 is a year.

248 may also refer to:

- The year 248 BC
- 248 (number)
- 248 Lameia, a main-belt asteroid
- Ferrari 248 F1, a Formula One racing car
