= 236 BC =

236 BC in various calendars
- Gregorian calendar: 236 BC; CCXXXVI BC
- Ab urbe condita: 518
- Ancient Egypt era: XXXIII dynasty, 88
- Pharaoh: Ptolemy III Euergetes, 11
- Ancient Greek Olympiad (summer): 136th Olympiad (victor)¹
- Assyrian calendar: 4515
- Balinese saka calendar: N/A
- Bengali calendar: −829 – −828
- Berber calendar: 715
- Buddhist calendar: 309
- Burmese calendar: −873
- Byzantine calendar: 5273–5274
- Chinese calendar: 甲子年 (Wood Rat); 2462 or 2255 — to — 乙丑年 (Wood Ox); 2463 or 2256
- Coptic calendar: −519 – −518
- Discordian calendar: 931
- Ethiopian calendar: −243 – −242
- Hebrew calendar: 3525–3526
- Hindu calendars
- Vikram Samvat: −179 – −178
- Shaka Samvat: N/A
- Kali Yuga: 2865–2866
- Holocene calendar: 9765
- Iranian calendar: 857 BP – 856 BP
- Islamic calendar: 883 BH – 882 BH
- Javanese calendar: N/A
- Julian calendar: N/A
- Korean calendar: 2098
- Minguo calendar: 2147 before ROC 民前2147年
- Nanakshahi calendar: −1703
- Seleucid era: 76/77 AG
- Thai solar calendar: 307–308
- Tibetan calendar: ཤིང་ཕོ་བྱི་བ་ལོ་ (male Wood-Rat) −109 or −490 or −1262 — to — ཤིང་མོ་གླང་ལོ་ (female Wood-Ox) −108 or −489 or −1261

Year 236 BC was a year of the pre-Julian Roman calendar. At the time it was known as the Year of the Consulship of Caudinus and Varus (or, less frequently, year 518 Ab urbe condita). The denomination 236 BC for this year has been used since the early medieval period, when the Anno Domini calendar era became the prevalent method in Europe for naming years.

== Events ==
=== By place ===
==== Asia Minor ====
- Antiochus Hierax, supported by his mother Laodice I, allies himself with the Galatians (Celts) and two other states that are traditional foes of the Seleucid kingdom. With the aid of these forces, he inflicts a crushing defeat on his older brother Seleucus II's army at Ancyra in Anatolia. Seleucus leaves the country beyond the Taurus Mountains to his brother and the other powers of the peninsula.

==== Egypt ====
- Eratosthenes is appointed by King Ptolemy III Euergetes as head and third librarian of the Alexandrian library.

==== China ====
- King Ying Zheng of the State of Qin begins a series of campaigns against the State of Zhao that will end with Zhao's conquest in 228 BC. The Qin generals Huan Yi Yang Duan He and Wang Jian seize nine cities in the Yecheng region.

==== Sri Lanka ====
- Buddhism is introduced to Sri Lanka by Mahinda, a monk acting on behalf of the late Ashoka.

== Births ==
- Scipio Africanus, Roman general in the Second Punic War and statesman of the Roman Republic (approximate date) (d. 183 BC)
