= Ptolichus =

Ptolichus (Greek: Πτόλιχος) is a name attributed to two individuals from Classical antiquity:

- Ptolichus of Aegina was an ancient Greek sculptor from Aegina. He was the son and pupil of Synnoön and flourished from about Olympiad 75 to about Olympiad 82, roughly 480-448 BC. The only works of his which are mentioned are the statues of two Olympic victors, Theognetus of Aegina, and Epicradius of Mantineia.
- Ptolichus of Corcyra was an ancient Greek sculptor from Corcyra and the pupil of Critios of Athens. Pausanias does not mention any work of his, but merely gives his name as one of the following artistic genealogy of teachers and pupils: Critias of Athens, Ptolichus, Amphion, Pison of Calauria, Damocritus of Sicyon (as distinguished from Democritus of Sicyon). He also had a pupil named Amphion, son of the sculptor Acestor. As Critios flourished chiefly about Olympiad 75, 477 BC, we may place this Ptolichus about Olympiad 83, or 448 BC. He was therefore a contemporary of Phidias.
