= Tisicrates =

Tisicrates (Ancient Greek: Τισικράτης) may refer to:

- Tisicrates of Sicyon, an ancient Greek sculptor
- Tisicrates of Croton, an ancient Greek athlete and two-time winner of the stadion race in the Olympic Games
