= Aristratus of Sicyon =

Aristratus was a tyrant of the ancient Greek city-state of Sicyon who flourished in the years when Philipp II of Macedon established his hegemony over Greece, probably between 346 and 337 BC.

Aristratus is named twice in Demosthenes speech On the Crown as one of the rulers who favoured the Macedonian king. In the first passage he is called an outcast by the orator. In the second passage he is mentioned together with another Sicyonian called Epichares, but it is not clear whether this man was an assistant, a colleague or a successor.

The fact that Aristratus was a tyrant is established by Plutarch in his biography of Aratus of Sicyon, where the author narrates the destruction of the former tyrants' portraits in the town hall of Sicyon after the reintroduction of democracy in 251 BC. According to Aratus' own memoirs, the most artful painting showed Aristratus with the goddess of victory Nike on a chariot. Although the artwork was by the hand of the famous painter Melanthius with the collaboration of the even more famous Apelles, Aratus insisted on its destruction, but his friend Nealkes convinced him to save at least the goddess and cancel only the tyrant's face. Nealkes, a painter in his own right, then painted a palm where Aristratus stood, but forgot his feet which remained visible underneath the chariot.
