= Xenocrates (disambiguation) =

Xenocrates (4th century BC) is a Chalcedonian philosopher.

Xenocrates or Xenokrates is also the name of:

- Xenokrates of Sicyon (3rd century BC), writer and sculptor
- Xenocrates of Aphrodisias (1st century AD), physician
