= Nealkes =

Nealkes or Nealces (Ancient Greek: Νεάλκης) was an ancient Greek painter from Sicyon who flourished in the 3rd century BC.

He was a friend of Aratus of Sicyon and after the liberation of their city in 251 BC he interceded to save an artful painting by Melanthius showing the former tyrant Aristratus of Sicyon with the goddess of victory Nike on a chariot. When Aratus insisted on the destruction of the portrait, Nealkes cried out in tears and finally offered to cancel the face by his own hand in order to save the rest of the artwork. He then painted a palm where the tyrant stood, but forgot his feet which remained visible underneath the chariot.

The best known of his own paintings were a portrait of Aphrodite and a Battle on the Nile with a famous detail showing an ass on the bank of the river being attacked by a crocodile.

His daughter was the painter Anaxandra, and his color-grinder was Erigonus, who was also a teacher of the modeller Aegineta.
