= 281 BC =

281 BC in various calendars
- Gregorian calendar: 281 BC; CCLXXXI BC
- Ab urbe condita: 473
- Ancient Egypt era: XXXIII dynasty, 43
- Pharaoh: Ptolemy II Philadelphus, 3
- Ancient Greek Olympiad (summer): 124th Olympiad, year 4
- Assyrian calendar: 4470
- Balinese saka calendar: N/A
- Bengali calendar: −874 – −873
- Berber calendar: 670
- Buddhist calendar: 264
- Burmese calendar: −918
- Byzantine calendar: 5228–5229
- Chinese calendar: 己卯年 (Earth Rabbit); 2417 or 2210 — to — 庚辰年 (Metal Dragon); 2418 or 2211
- Coptic calendar: −564 – −563
- Discordian calendar: 886
- Ethiopian calendar: −288 – −287
- Hebrew calendar: 3480–3481
- Hindu calendars
- Vikram Samvat: −224 – −223
- Shaka Samvat: N/A
- Kali Yuga: 2820–2821
- Holocene calendar: 9720
- Iranian calendar: 902 BP – 901 BP
- Islamic calendar: 930 BH – 929 BH
- Javanese calendar: N/A
- Julian calendar: N/A
- Korean calendar: 2053
- Minguo calendar: 2192 before ROC 民前2192年
- Nanakshahi calendar: −1748
- Seleucid era: 31/32 AG
- Thai solar calendar: 262–263
- Tibetan calendar: ས་མོ་ཡོས་ལོ་ (female Earth-Hare) −154 or −535 or −1307 — to — ལྕགས་ཕོ་འབྲུག་ལོ་ (male Iron-Dragon) −153 or −534 or −1306

Year 281 BC was a year of the pre-Julian Roman calendar. At the time it was known as the Year of the Consulship of Barbula and Philippus (or, less frequently, year 473 Ab urbe condita). The denomination 281 BC for this year has been used since the early medieval period, when the Anno Domini calendar era became the prevalent method in Europe for naming years.

== Events ==
=== By place ===
==== Asia Minor ====
- The Battle of Corupedium in Lydia is the last battle of the Diadochi, the rival successors to Alexander the Great. It is fought between the armies of Lysimachus, King of Thrace, Macedonia, Western Anatolia and Seleucus, ruler of Eastern Anatolia, Syria, Phoenicia, Judea, Babylonia and Iran. Seleucus kills Lysimachus during the battle.
- Following the Battle of Corupedium, Lysimachus's widow, Arsinoe, flees to Cassandrea, a city in northern Greece, where she marries her half-brother Ptolemy Keraunos. This proves to be a serious misjudgement, as Ptolemy Keraunus promptly kills two of her sons, though the third is able to escape. Arsinoe flees again, this time to Alexandria in Egypt.

==== Greece ====
- Seleucus takes over Thrace and then tries to seize Macedonia. However, he falls into a trap near Lysimachia, Thrace, set by Ptolemy Keraunos, one of the sons of Ptolemy I and Arsinoe II's half brother, who murders Seleucus and takes Macedonia for himself.
- Cineas, a Thessalian serving as chief adviser to King Pyrrhus of Epirus, after visiting Rome attempts, without success, to dissuade Pyrrhus from invading southern Italy.

==== Seleucid Empire ====
- Seleucus is succeeded as ruler of the Seleucid Empire by Antiochus, who was already king of the Syrian part of the empire. He is immediately beset by revolts in Syria (probably instigated by Ptolemy II of Egypt) and by independence movements in northern Anatolia.
- Although he has only a few bases in Greece, Antigonus II Gonatas lays claim to Macedonia. His claim is disputed by Antiochus I.

== Births ==
- Zhuangxiang of Qin, Chinese king of the Qin State (d. 247 BC)

== Deaths ==
- Lysimachus, king of Thrace and Macedonia (b. c. 360 BC)
- Seleucus I Nicator, founder of the Seleucid Empire (b. c. 354 BC)
