= Canachus the Younger =

Sculptor from Sicyon

Canachus the Younger (in Greek; Κάναχος ο Σικυώνιος, 5th/4th century BC) was a sculptor from Sicyon. A known work of his is the bronze statue of the Olympic victor Bycelus of Sicyon during the 95th (400 BC) Olympic Games of antiquity. Additionally, he contributed to the construction of a group of sculptures at Delphi in 404 BC, commissioned by the Spartan general Lysander, which included sculptures of two Spartan soldiers who fought at the Battle of Aegospotami: Epicydidas and Eteonicus. His grandfather is believed to have been Canachus the Elder (6th century BC), also a sculptor by profession.
