= Timanthes of Sicyon =

Timanthes of Sicyon (Greek: Τιμάνθης ὁ Σικυώνιος) was an ancient Greek painter of the 3rd century BC.

In 250 BC he accompanied Aratus of Sicyon on his voyage to Alexandria and later he celebrated his victory against the Aetolians with a famous painting of the Battle of Pellene (241 BC).
