= Glyceria (name) =

Glyceria is the Latin form of the Greek given name Glykeria (Greek: Γλυκερία). Another Latin form is Glycera. The colloquial Russian form of the name is Lukerya (Russian: Лукерья). Notable people with the name include:

- Saint Glyceria of Heraclea (2nd century)
- Saint Glyceria of Novgorod (d. circa 1522), Russian saint
