= Ascarus =

Ancient Greek sculptor

Ascarus (Ancient Greek: Ἄσκαρος) was a sculptor of ancient Thebes, who made a statue of the Greek god Zeus, which was dedicated by the Thessalians at Olympia. The classicist Friedrich Thiersch believed that he was a pupil of the sculptor Ageladas.
