= Eupompus =

Greek painter

Eupompus (Ancient Greek: Εὔπομπος) was the founder of the great Sicyonic school of painting, which flourished in the 4th century BC at Sicyon in Ancient Greece. He was eclipsed by his successors, and is chiefly remembered for the advice which he is said to have given to Lysippus: to follow nature rather than any master.

Eupompus was succeeded as head of the Sicyonic school by Pamphilus of Amphipolis, teacher of Apelles.

Ben Jonson makes the cryptic reference, in his Discoveries: "Eupompus gave it (art) splendour by numbers and other elegancies." Aldous Huxley wrote a fanciful story for his first collection, 'Limbo', in which a modern scholar tracks down the story behind the remark.
