= Trick at Mecone =

Mythological tricking of Zeus

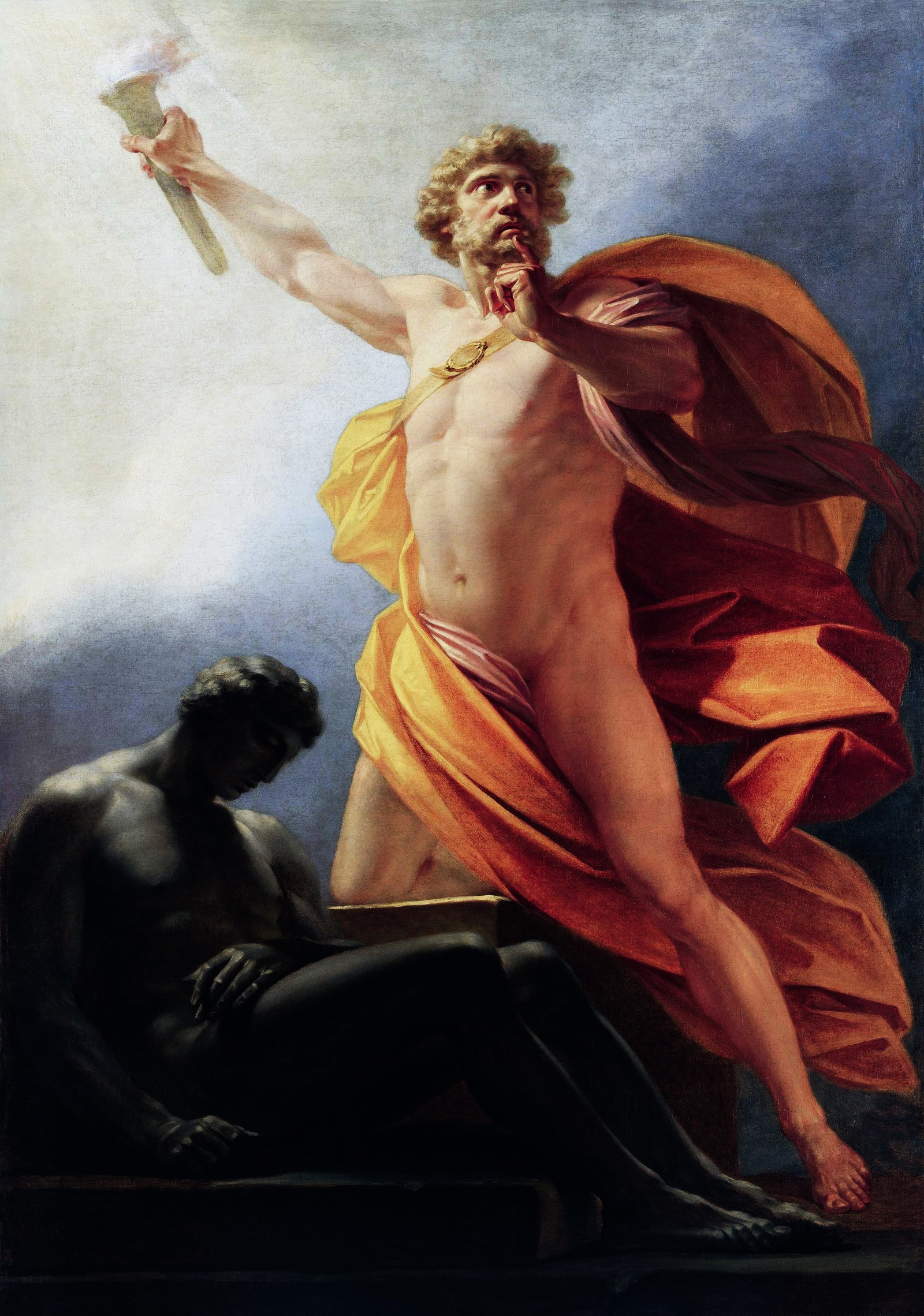
Prometheus Brings Fire to Mankind, Heinrich Friedrich Füger, c. 1817. Prometheus brings fire to humanity, it having been hidden as revenge for the trick at Mecone

The trick at Mecone or Mekone (Mi-kon) was an event in Greek mythology first attested by Hesiod in which Prometheus tricked Zeus for humanity’s benefit, and thus incurred his wrath. It is unusual among Greek myths for being etiological, i.e. explaining the origins of an object or custom. 'Mecone' or 'Mekone' was identified in Classical times with Sicyon, though it is unknown if Hesiod recognized this identification.

== The story ==
The story survives only in Hesiod's Theogony, with the exception of a brief reference to it in the works of Callimachus.

The gods and mortal humans had arranged a meeting at Mecone where the matter of division of sacrifice between gods and humans was to be settled. Prometheus slew a large ox, and divided it into two piles. In one pile he put all the meat and most of the fat, skillfully covering it with the ox's grotesque stomach, while in the other pile, he dressed up the bones artfully with shining fat. Prometheus then invited Zeus to choose; Zeus chose the pile of bones. Hesiod describes Zeus as having seen through the trick, realizing that in purposefully getting tricked he would have an excuse to vent his anger on mortal humans. It may be, however, that in mainstream versions of the story Zeus was actually deceived, and that Hesiod is trying to be pious by changing the story to make Zeus look better.

As an act of revenge, Zeus hid fire from humankind, leaving them cold and shivering at night. Prometheus, however, out of pity stole it for them shortly after, incurring the further wrath of Zeus. Prometheus's punishment was to be chained to a rock and have an eagle (or a vulture by some variants) pick out his liver every day for eons, until Heracles slew the eagle, releasing Prometheus from his affliction. The Theogony text is ambiguous about whether Prometheus was freed or remained chained to the rock, but lines 615-616 are usually interpreted as indicating that he remained bound.

== Interpretations ==
The story gives a mythological explanation (etiology) of the practice of sacrificing only the bones to the gods, while humans get to keep the edible meat and fat. It is also the first sacrifice to the gods, and sets the precedent for humans establishing or renewing a covenant with sacrifice.
