= Glycera (courtesan) =

Popular name often used for Hellenistic hetaerae

Glycera (Ancient Greek: Γλυκέρα) (the sweet one) was a popular name often used for Hellenistic hetaerae, held by:

1. The daughter of Thalassis and the mistress of Harpalus and Menander. (Athen. xiii. pp. 586, 595, 605, &c.)
2. The mistress of Pausias, born in Sicyon.
3. A favourite of Horace^{(?)}. (Hor. Carm. i. 19. 30. iii. 19.29.)
4. Nominally, Alcibiades's sexual partner in Caracci's engravings for I Modi.

== Harpalus's mistress ==
Originating from Athens in the second half of the 4th century BC. After the death of his previous mistress Pythionice (between 329 BC and 324 BC), Harpalus obtained Glycera using funds derived from his office. In return for her Harpalus sent grain to Athens and guaranteed their citizenship rights.

She accompanied Harpalus in his escape from India with Alexander, and later returned to Athens, where she allegedly became the love of the poet Menander.

== Fictional ==
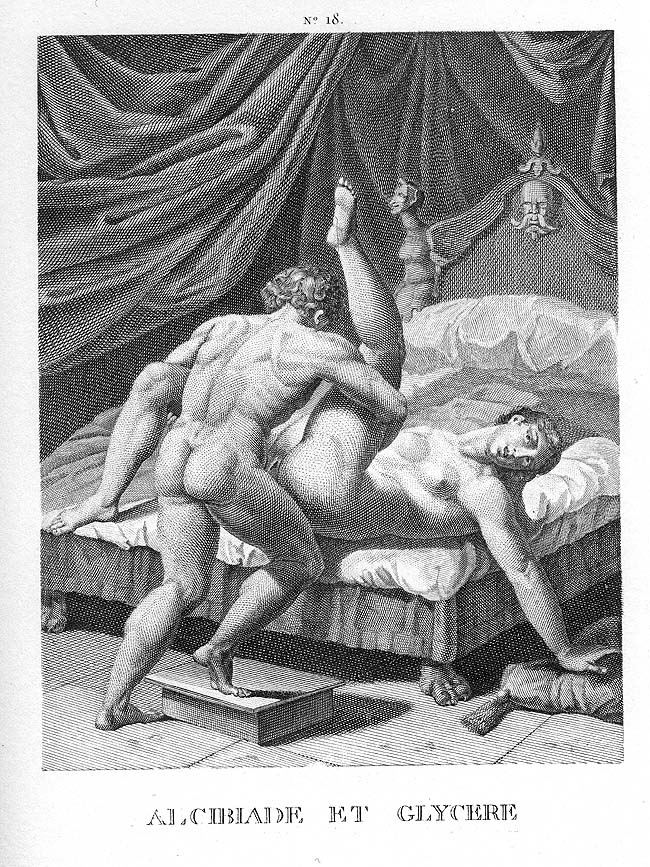
'Glycera and Alcibiades'

One of the images of sexual positions in Agostino Carracci's engravings for I Modi is entitled 'Alcibiades and Glycera'. This is not meant to be a portrait of any of the historical Glyceras, for the identification is only nominal, acting as a thin classical veneer for the image's erotic or pornographic intent. These engraving's titles usually use a historically verified pair of lovers (e.g. Dido and Aeneas), but that is not the case here - Glycera is 4th century BC whilst Alcibiades is 5th century BC - making the veneer here even thinner than usual.

== Sources ==
- Post, L.A.; "Woman's Place in Menander's Athens", Transactions and Proceedings of the American Philological Association, Vol. 71, 1940, pp. 420–459
- Ancient Library^{[usurped]}
