= Baccheidas =

Ancient Greek dancer

Baccheidas (Ancient Greek: Βακχείδας) of Sicyon was a dancer and teacher of music, in honor of whom there is an ancient epigram of four lines preserved by the 2nd century CE grammarian Athenaeus. His time is unknown; it is only certain that he lived in or before the 2nd century.
