= Alypus =

5th-century BC Greek sculptor

Alypus (Ancient Greek: Ἄλυπος) was a sculptor of ancient Greece, a native of Sicyon. He studied under Naucydes of Argos. His age may be fixed from his having executed bronze statues of some Spartans who shared in the victory of Lysander at Aegospotami around 405 BC. Pausanias also mentions some statues of victors of the Ancient Olympic Games made by him.
