= Aegineta =

Ancient Greek artist

Aegineta was an ancient Greek modeller (or fictor, one who sculpts with clay or other plastic material) mentioned by Pliny the Elder. Some scholars supposed that the word Aeginetae in the passage of Pliny denoted merely the country—Aegina—of some artist, whose real name was not given. The consensus of scholarly opinion is now against this hypothesis, however, and it is generally believed that "Aegineta" was the man's given name.

Aegineta's brother Pasias, a painter of some distinction, was a pupil of Erigonus, who had been color-grinder to the artist Nealkes. Plutarch says that that Nealkes was a friend of Aratus of Sicyon, who was first elected strategos of the Achaean League in 243 BC. This would make it possible that Aegineta and his brother flourished about 220.

Aegineta is artistic traditions of ancient Greece during the hellenistic period. His work as a modeller involved shaping clay and other materials.
