= Timocleidas =

Ancient Greek tyrant

Timocleidas (Greek: Τιμοκλείδας) was a tyrant of the ancient Greek city-state of Sicyon in the 3rd century BC. After the violent death of the previous tyrant Cleon, he ruled jointly with Euthydemus, until the two were deposed by the citizens of Sicyon. Timocleidas and Euthydemus were replaced by the democrat Cleinias, although the historian Plutarch believed that Timocleidas ruled jointly with Cleinias. Timocleidas died during Cleinias's reign.
