= Dipoenus and Scyllis =

Ancient Greek sculptors

Dipoenus (Ancient Greek: Διποίνος) and Scyllis (Ancient Greek: Σκύλλις) were early ancient Greek sculptors from Crete who worked together and were said to have been pupils of Daedalus. Pliny assigns to them the date 580 BC, and says that they worked at Sicyon, which city from their time onwards became one of the great schools of sculpture. They also made statues for Cleonae and Argos. They worked in wood, ebony and ivory, and apparently also in marble.
