= Tisicrates of Sicyon =

Ancient Greek sculptor

Tisicrates (also spelled Tisikrates,Teisicrates, and Teisikrates; Ancient Greek: Τισικράτης or Τεισικράτης) was a sculptor from Sicyon. Ancient sources associate him with the school of Lysippus, and Pliny the Elder introduces him in a way that leaves some uncertainty over whether he was a pupil of Lysippus himself or of Lysippus's son Euthycrates. Most writers, however, list him as a disciple of Euthycrates.

Ancient writers describe his style as close to that of Lysippus. According to Pliny the Elder, several of Tisicrates statues were so similar to those of Lysippus that they were difficult to tell apart.

Tisicrates was also the father of the painter Arcesilaus, and either he or Euthycrates was the teacher of Xenokrates of Sicyon.

His excellence was especially noted in equestrian groups, and Pliny remarks of the statue of Peucestes that he was "dignus tanta gloria" ("worthy of such great renown").

Pliny mentions the below works by Tisicrates:

- Aged Theban
- King Demetrius
- Peucestes
- A two-horse chariot (Biga (chariot)), and later the artist Piston added a woman to it.

In a passage of Pliny (Nat. 34.8.12), some editions give the name as Tisicratis, but this reading is based solely on a conjecture by the editor Gronovius. A later scholar, Sillig, suggested that the correct name is actually Amphicratis, a reading confirmed by the Bamberg manuscript. Therefore, the appearance of Tisicrates in this passage is likely a copyist or editorial error rather than a reference to the sculptor himself.

A marble sculpture found near Albano bears the signature "ΤΕΙΣΙΚΡΑΤΗΣ ΕΠΟΙΕΙ" ("Teisicrates made this"), which may indicate a second sculptor named Tisicrates. Scholar M. Raoul-Rochette considered it almost certainly a different individual. However, it is also possible that the marble is simply a copy of a bronze work by the Tisicrates of Sicyon. The spelling ΤΕΙΣΙΚΡΑΤΗΣ (with EI) is a known variant in Greek names and therefore does not, by itself, prove that it refers to a different sculptor.
