= Anaxandra =

Ancient Greek artist and painter

Anaxandra (Ancient Greek: Ἀναξάνδρα; fl. 220s BC) was an ancient Greek female artist and painter from Greece. She was the daughter and student of Nealkes, a painter of mythological and genre scenes. She painted c. 228 B.C. She is mentioned by Clement of Alexandria, the 2nd century Christian theologian, in a section of his Stromateis (Miscellanies) entitled "Women as Well as Men Capable of Perfection". Clement cites a lost work of the Hellenistic scholar Didymus Chalcenterus (1st century BC) as his source.

== Modern uses ==
Her name was given by the International Astronomical Union in 1994 to a large 20 km diameter crater on Venus to commemorate the artist. The name was also used by the author Caroline B. Cooney for the principal character in her 2003 novel Goddess of Yesterday, which is set during the Trojan War.

== See also ==
- List of craters on Venus
