= Pythocles of Sicyon =

Ancient Greek athlete

Pythocles of Sicyon was an ancient Greek athlete listed by Eusebius of Caesarea as a victor in the stadion race of the 136th Olympiad (236 BC).

In his later career Pythocles appears to have served as a representative of the Achaean League. The evidence comes from an inscription in Epidaurus where he is mentioned in a honorific list together with 23 other nomographoi. On that list his father's name is given as Pythodoros.

== See also ==
- List of Olympic winners of the Stadion race
