= Euthydemus (tyrant) =

Euthydemus (Ancient Greek: Εὐθύδημος) was a tyrant of the ancient Greek city-state of Sicyon in the 3rd century BC. He ruled jointly with Timocleidas, but the two were deposed by the citizens of Sicyon. They replaced Euthydemus and Timocleidas with Cleinias, although the historian Plutarch believed that Timocleidas ruled jointly with Cleinias.
