= 302 BC =

302 BC in various calendars
- Gregorian calendar: 302 BC; CCCII BC
- Ab urbe condita: 452
- Ancient Egypt era: XXXIII dynasty, 22
- Pharaoh: Ptolemy I Soter, 22
- Ancient Greek Olympiad (summer): 119th Olympiad, year 3
- Assyrian calendar: 4449
- Balinese saka calendar: N/A
- Bengali calendar: −895 – −894
- Berber calendar: 649
- Buddhist calendar: 243
- Burmese calendar: −939
- Byzantine calendar: 5207–5208
- Chinese calendar: 戊午年 (Earth Horse); 2396 or 2189 — to — 己未年 (Earth Goat); 2397 or 2190
- Coptic calendar: −585 – −584
- Discordian calendar: 865
- Ethiopian calendar: −309 – −308
- Hebrew calendar: 3459–3460
- Hindu calendars
- Vikram Samvat: −245 – −244
- Shaka Samvat: N/A
- Kali Yuga: 2799–2800
- Holocene calendar: 9699
- Iranian calendar: 923 BP – 922 BP
- Islamic calendar: 951 BH – 950 BH
- Javanese calendar: N/A
- Julian calendar: N/A
- Korean calendar: 2032
- Minguo calendar: 2213 before ROC 民前2213年
- Nanakshahi calendar: −1769
- Seleucid era: 10/11 AG
- Thai solar calendar: 241–242
- Tibetan calendar: ས་ཕོ་རྟ་ལོ་ (male Earth-Horse) −175 or −556 or −1328 — to — ས་མོ་ལུག་ལོ་ (female Earth-Sheep) −174 or −555 or −1327

Year 302 BC was a year of the pre-Julian Roman calendar. At the time, it was known as the Year of the Consulship of Denter and Paullus (or, less frequently, year 452 Ab urbe condita). The denomination 302 BC for this year has been used since the early medieval period, when the Anno Domini calendar era became the prevalent method in Europe for naming years.

== Events ==
=== By place ===
==== Asia Minor ====
- Following their agreement to work together to defeat Antigonus, Seleucus invades Asia Minor from Babylonia, while Ptolemy attacks Syria and Lysimachus moves into the western part of Asia Minor.
- Docimus, the regent of Phrygia, and Phoenix, the strategos of Lycia, desert Antigonus.
- The Macedonian general, Philetaerus, moves his allegiance from Antigonus to Antigonus' rival, Lysimachus. In return, Lysimachus makes Philetaerus guardian of the fortress of Pergamum with its treasure of some 9,000 talents.

==== Greece ====
- Antigonus' son Demetrius Poliorcetes attacks Cassander's forces in Thessaly. Cassander loses his possessions south of Thessaly to Demetrius. Antigonus and Demetrius crown their success by renewing the pan-Hellenic league. Ambassadors from all the Hellenic states (with the exception of Sparta, Messenia and Thessaly) meet at Corinth to elect Antigonus and Demetrius protectors of the new league.
- As Antigonus is finding his enemies closing in on him, a truce is made and the gains by Demetrius have to be abandoned. Demetrius reaches Ephesus to support his father.
- Pyrrhus is dethroned as King of Epirus by an uprising and joins Demetrius while in exile.

== Births ==
- Maharani Devi, Mauryan empress and wife of Ashoka
- Xiaowen of Qin, Chinese king of the Qin State (d. 250 BC)

== Deaths ==
- Mithridates II of Cius, ruler of Cius in Mysia from 337 to 302 BC
