= Eutychides =

3rd century BC Greek sculptor

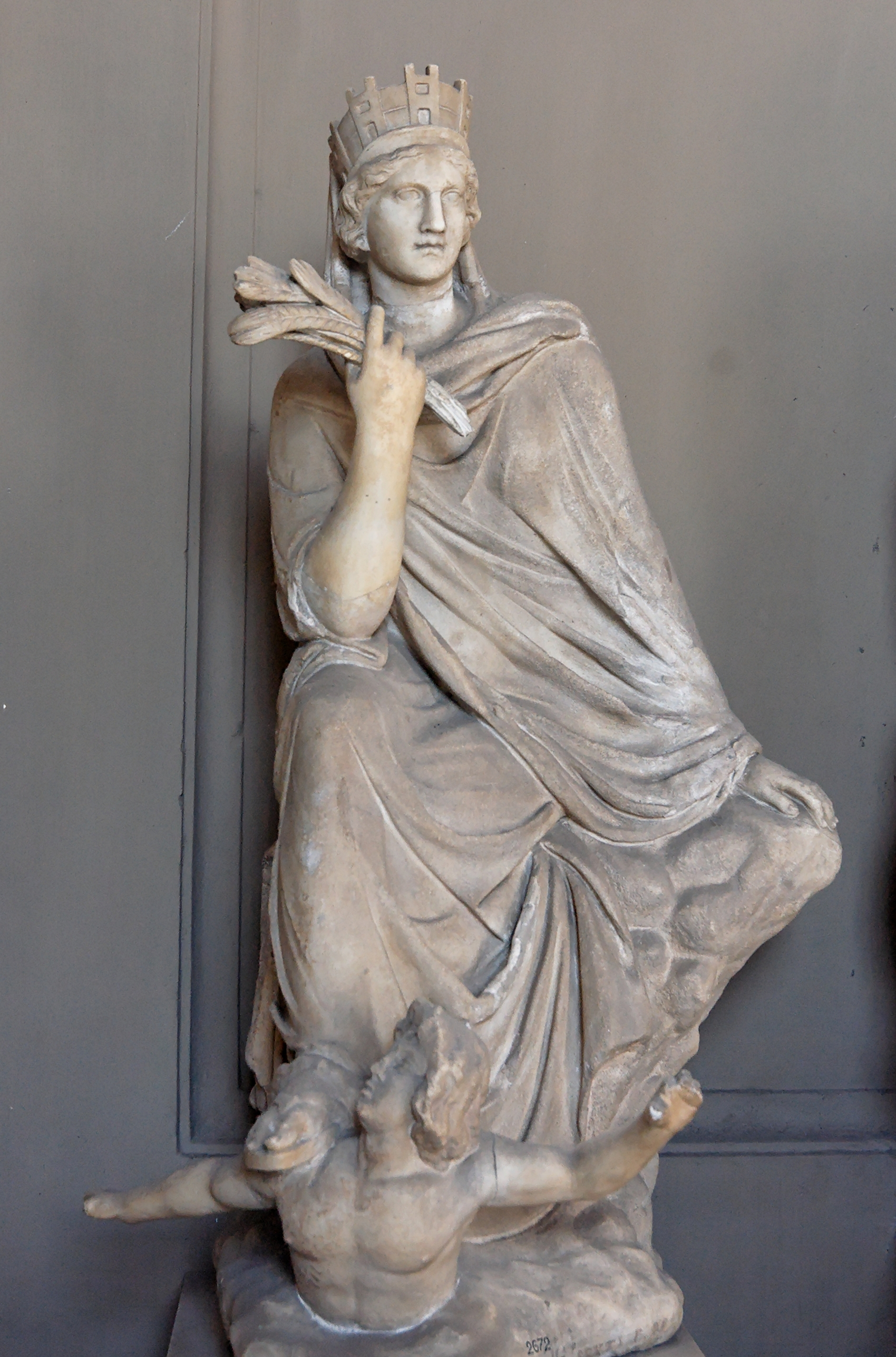
Marble Roman copy of Eutychides' Tyche of Antioch, Galleria dei Candelabri, Vatican Museums; original dates back to the 3rd century BC.

Eutychides /juːˈtɪkədiːz/ (Ancient Greek: Εὐτυχίδης, Eutukhídēs) of Sicyon in Corinthia, Greek sculptor of the early part of the 3rd century BC, was a pupil of Lysippus. His most noted work was a statue of the Tyche of Antioch, a goddess who embodied the idea of the then newly founded city of Antioch. The Tyche was seated on a rock, crowned with towers, and having the river Orontes at her feet. There is a small copy of the statue in the Vatican. It was imitated by a number of Asiatic cities; and indeed most statues since created that commemorate cities borrow something from the work of Eutychides.

At the invitation of king Areus, Eutychides spent some time in Sparta, where he made a statue of the Eurotas river, and perhaps another of a seated Herakles, in the 280s or 270s.

== List of known works ==
- Tyche of Antioch
- Allegory of the Eurotas river, in Sparta
- Allegory of the Nile
- Allegory of the Orontes river
- Herakles seated and reclining on his mace, in Sparta

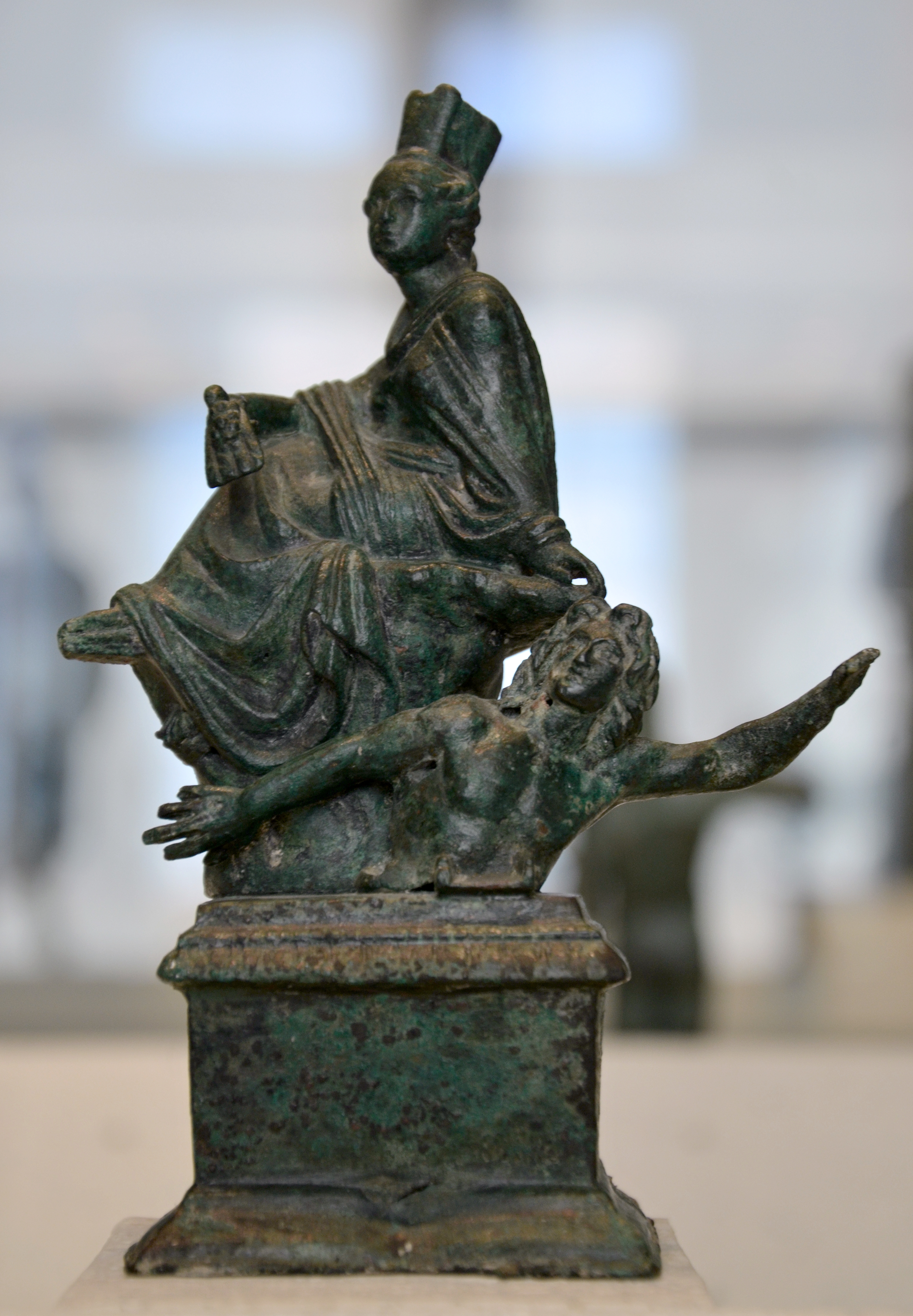
Bronze copy from Tartus of the Tyche of Antioch, 1st or 2nd century AD, Louvre Museum

== Bibliography ==
- Bernard Legras & Jacqueline Christien, Dialogues d'histoire ancienne Supplément N° 11, Sparte hellénistique, IVe-IIIe siècles avant notre ère, Presses universitaires de Franche-Comté, 2014. ISBN 978-2-84867-493-3
- Daniel Ogden, The Legend of Seleucus, Kingship, Narrative and Mythmaking in the Ancient Greek World, Cambridge University Press, 2017. ISBN 9781107164789
