= 325 BC =

325 BC in various calendars
- Gregorian calendar: 325 BC; CCCXXV BC
- Ab urbe condita: 429
- Ancient Egypt era: XXXII dynasty, 8
- Pharaoh: Alexander the Great, 8
- Ancient Greek Olympiad (summer): 113th Olympiad, year 4
- Assyrian calendar: 4426
- Balinese saka calendar: N/A
- Bengali calendar: −918 – −917
- Berber calendar: 626
- Buddhist calendar: 220
- Burmese calendar: −962
- Byzantine calendar: 5184–5185
- Chinese calendar: 乙未年 (Wood Goat); 2373 or 2166 — to — 丙申年 (Fire Monkey); 2374 or 2167
- Coptic calendar: −608 – −607
- Discordian calendar: 842
- Ethiopian calendar: −332 – −331
- Hebrew calendar: 3436–3437
- Hindu calendars
- Vikram Samvat: −268 – −267
- Shaka Samvat: N/A
- Kali Yuga: 2776–2777
- Holocene calendar: 9676
- Iranian calendar: 946 BP – 945 BP
- Islamic calendar: 975 BH – 974 BH
- Javanese calendar: N/A
- Julian calendar: N/A
- Korean calendar: 2009
- Minguo calendar: 2236 before ROC 民前2236年
- Nanakshahi calendar: −1792
- Thai solar calendar: 218–219
- Tibetan calendar: ཤིང་མོ་ལུག་ལོ་ (female Wood-Sheep) −198 or −579 or −1351 — to — མེ་ཕོ་སྤྲེ་ལོ་ (male Fire-Monkey) −197 or −578 or −1350

Year 325 BC was a year of the pre-Julian Roman calendar. At the time, it was known as the Year of the Consulship of Camillus and Scaeva (or, less frequently, year 429 Ab urbe condita). The denomination 325 BC for this year has been used since the early medieval period, when the Anno Domini calendar era became the prevalent method in Europe for naming years.

== Events ==
=== By place ===
==== Europe ====
- (around this year) – Pytheas made a voyage of naval exploration to northwestern Europe, reaching Britain and the Baltic Sea, and mentioning Thule as the furthest island to the north in the Atlantic.

==== Macedonian Empire ====
- Alexander the Great leaves India and nominates his officer Peithon, son of Agenor, as the satrap of the region around the Indus.
- Alexander the Great orders his admiral, Nearchus, to sail from the Hydaspes River in western India to the Persian Gulf and up the Euphrates River to Babylon while Alexander's army starts marching through Gedrosia (Baluchistan).
- While returning to Persia, Alexander's army runs into the Malli clans (in modern day Multan). The ensuing battle severely weakens his army. Alexander sends much of his remaining army to Carmania (modern southern Iran) with his general Craterus, while he leads the rest of his forces back to Persia by the southern route through the Gedrosian Desert (now part of southern Iran and Makran in southern Pakistan).
- By the end of the year, Alexander's army reaches Persepolis, while his navy, under Nearchus, reaches Susa at around the same time.
- The first known reference to sugar cane appears in writings by Alexander the Great's admiral Nearchus, who writes of Indian reeds "that produce honey, although there are no bees".

==== Sicily ====
- Agathocles, a rich and ambitious citizen of Syracuse, is exiled for attempting to overthrow the oligarchic party in the city.

==== China ====
- Going against his loyalty to the figurehead monarch of the Zhou dynasty, the Qin ruler, Duke Huiwen, takes on the title of King Huiwen, claiming royal title and sparking a trend amongst other Warring States rulers to do the same.
- King Wuling ascends to the throne of Zhao.

==== Americas ====
- La Venta, an Olmec island city, is believed to be completely abandoned by this time.

=== By topic ===
==== Art ====
- The fourth-century (Late Classical) period of sculpture ends in Ancient Greece and is succeeded by the Hellenistic period (approximate date).

==== Philosophy ====
- Aristotle writes Ta Ethika on virtue and moral character (approximate date).

== Births ==
- Euclid, Greek mathematician who will come to live in Alexandria (d. c. 275 BC)
- Gongsun Long, Chinese scholar and philosopher (approximate date)
- Zhaoxiang of Qin, Chinese king of the Qin State (d. 250 BC)
