= 345 BC =

345 BC in various calendars
- Gregorian calendar: 345 BC; CCCXLV BC
- Ab urbe condita: 409
- Ancient Egypt era: XXX dynasty, 36
- Pharaoh: Nectanebo II, 16
- Ancient Greek Olympiad (summer): 108th Olympiad, year 4
- Assyrian calendar: 4406
- Balinese saka calendar: N/A
- Bengali calendar: −938 – −937
- Berber calendar: 606
- Buddhist calendar: 200
- Burmese calendar: −982
- Byzantine calendar: 5164–5165
- Chinese calendar: 乙亥年 (Wood Pig); 2353 or 2146 — to — 丙子年 (Fire Rat); 2354 or 2147
- Coptic calendar: −628 – −627
- Discordian calendar: 822
- Ethiopian calendar: −352 – −351
- Hebrew calendar: 3416–3417
- Hindu calendars
- Vikram Samvat: −288 – −287
- Shaka Samvat: N/A
- Kali Yuga: 2756–2757
- Holocene calendar: 9656
- Iranian calendar: 966 BP – 965 BP
- Islamic calendar: 996 BH – 995 BH
- Javanese calendar: N/A
- Julian calendar: N/A
- Korean calendar: 1989
- Minguo calendar: 2256 before ROC 民前2256年
- Nanakshahi calendar: −1812
- Thai solar calendar: 198–199
- Tibetan calendar: ཤིང་མོ་ཕག་ལོ་ (female Wood-Boar) −218 or −599 or −1371 — to — མེ་ཕོ་བྱི་བ་ལོ་ (male Fire-Rat) −217 or −598 or −1370

Year 345 BC was a year of the pre-Julian Roman calendar. At the time it was known as the Year of the Consulship of Dorsuo and Camerinus (or, less frequently, year 409 Ab urbe condita). The denomination 345 BC for this year has been used since the early medieval period, when the Anno Domini calendar era became the prevalent method in Europe for naming years.

== Events ==
=== By place ===
==== Greece ====
- Supported by Thebes and Thessaly, Macedonia takes over Phocis' votes in the Amphictyonic League, a Greek religious organisation formed to support the greater temples of Apollo and Demeter. Despite some reluctance on the part of the Athenian leaders, Athens finally accepts Philip II's entry into the Council of the League. The Athenian statesman Demosthenes is among those who recommend this stance in his oration On the Peace.

==== India ====
- The Nanda Empire is founded in Magadha.

==== Italy ====
- Carthaginians ravage and blockade Entella.

== Deaths ==
- Nicochares, Athenian poet of the Old Comedy
- Mahanandin, last king of the Shishunaga dynasty of the Indian subcontinent.
