= Abantidas =

Tyrant of the Greek city-state of Sicyon from 264 to 252 BC

- Tyrant of Sicyon
- Reign: 264 BC-252 BC
- Predecessor: Cleinias
- Successor: Paseas
- Died: 252 BC; Sicyon
- Father: Paseas

Abantidas (in Greek Ἀβαντίδας) (died 252 BC), the son of Paseas, became tyrant of the ancient Greek city-state of Sicyon in 264 BC after murdering Cleinias, the father of Aratus. After the assassination, Abantidas had the remaining friends and relations of Cleinias banished or put to death.

Aratus, the son of Cleinias, who was then only seven years old, narrowly escaped death by fleeing into the house of Soso, Abantidas' sister, who happened to be married to Prophantus, the late Cleinias' brother. She hid him in the house, and at night sent him secretly off to Argos. Abantidas was fond of literature, and was accustomed to attending the philosophical discussions of Deinias of Argos and Aristotle the dialectician, in the agora of Sicyon. During one of these occasions in 252 BC, with the complicity of the two rhetors, he was murdered by his enemies.

After his death, his father, Paseas succeeded him as tyrant. But later Nicocles killed Paseas.
