= 183 BC =

183 BC in various calendars
- Gregorian calendar: 183 BC; CLXXXIII BC
- Ab urbe condita: 571
- Ancient Egypt era: XXXIII dynasty, 141
- Pharaoh: Ptolemy V Epiphanes, 21
- Ancient Greek Olympiad (summer): 149th Olympiad, year 2
- Assyrian calendar: 4568
- Balinese saka calendar: N/A
- Bengali calendar: −776 – −775
- Berber calendar: 768
- Buddhist calendar: 362
- Burmese calendar: −820
- Byzantine calendar: 5326–5327
- Chinese calendar: 丁巳年 (Fire Snake); 2515 or 2308 — to — 戊午年 (Earth Horse); 2516 or 2309
- Coptic calendar: −466 – −465
- Discordian calendar: 984
- Ethiopian calendar: −190 – −189
- Hebrew calendar: 3578–3579
- Hindu calendars
- Vikram Samvat: −126 – −125
- Shaka Samvat: N/A
- Kali Yuga: 2918–2919
- Holocene calendar: 9818
- Iranian calendar: 804 BP – 803 BP
- Islamic calendar: 829 BH – 828 BH
- Javanese calendar: N/A
- Julian calendar: N/A
- Korean calendar: 2151
- Minguo calendar: 2094 before ROC 民前2094年
- Nanakshahi calendar: −1650
- Seleucid era: 129/130 AG
- Thai solar calendar: 360–361
- Tibetan calendar: མེ་མོ་སྦྲུལ་ལོ་ (female Fire-Snake) −56 or −437 or −1209 — to — ས་ཕོ་རྟ་ལོ་ (male Earth-Horse) −55 or −436 or −1208

Year 183 BC was a year of the pre-Julian Roman calendar. At the time it was known as the Year of the Consulship of Marcellus and Labeo (or, less frequently, year 571 Ab urbe condita). The denomination 183 BC for this year has been used since the early medieval period, when the Anno Domini calendar era became the prevalent method in Europe for naming years.

== Events ==
=== By place ===
==== Roman Republic ====
- Roman colonies are established at Mutina (later Modena), Pisa and Parma in northern and central Italy.
- The Roman general Scipio Africanus dies at Liternum in Campania.
- The Roman statesman Titus Quinctius Flamininus is sent to the court of Prusias I, king of Bithynia, to demand the surrender of the former Carthaginian statesman and general Hannibal. When Hannibal finds out that Prusias is about to agree to the Roman demands and thus betray him, he poisons himself in the village of Libyssa in Bithynia.

==== Greece ====
- The town of Messene rebels against the Achaean League. When the Achaean League's general, Philopoemen, intervenes to try to control the rebellion, he is captured during a skirmish and imprisoned. He is then given poison to take so that he can die honourably.

== Births ==
- Publius Cornelius Scipio Nasica Serapio, consul in 138 BC, who will have a prominent part in the murder of Tiberius Gracchus by leading a group of conservative senators and other knights in opposition to Gracchus and his supporters (d. 132 BC).

== Deaths ==
- Publius Cornelius Scipio Africanus Major, Roman statesman and general, famous for his victory over the Carthaginian leader Hannibal in the Battle of Zama in 202 BC, which ended the Second Punic War and gave him the surname Africanus (b. 236 BC)
- Philopoemen, Greek general and statesman, strategos of the Achaean League on eight occasions and a major figure in the demise of Sparta as a Greek power (b. 253 BC)
- Hannibal, Carthaginian statesman, military commander and tactician, one of history's great military leaders, who has commanded the Carthaginian forces against Rome in the Second Punic War (b. 247 BC)
