= Canachus =

Sculptor of Sicyon in Corinthia

Canachus (Ancient Greek: Κάναχος Kanakhos) was a sculptor of Sicyon in Corinthia, in the latter part of the 6th century BCE. He was especially noted as the author of two great statues of Apollo, one in bronze made for the temple at Didyma near Miletus, and one in cedar wood made for Thebes. The coins of Miletus furnish us with copies of the former and show the god to have held a stag in one hand and a bow in the other. The rigidity of these works naturally impressed later critics.

Sculptures of two Spartan soldiers who fought at the Battle of Aegospotami were attributed to Canachus by Pausanias. These sculptures were probably the work of his namesake grandson, Canachus the Younger
