= Xenokrates of Sicyon =

Xenokrates of Athens or of Sicyon (Greek: Ξενοκράτης; fl. c. 280 BC) was an ancient Greek sculptor and writer, and one of the world's first art historians. Three signed statue bases are all that survive of his work. Pliny the Elder described him as a pupil of either Euthykrates or Teisikrates, and states that he surpassed both in his career, and that he wrote several volumes concerning his craft. Pliny the Elder's entire dissertation on the history of sculpture and painting is believed to have been strongly influenced by the work of Xenokrates. He was the art critic most familiar to the Romans of the late Republic, and he greatly influenced their tastes.
