= 320 BC =

320 BC in various calendars
Gregorian calendar	320 BC; CCCXX BC
Ab urbe condita	434
Ancient Egypt era	XXXIII dynasty, 4
Pharaoh	Ptolemy I Soter, 4
Ancient Greek Olympiad (summer)	115th Olympiad (victor)¹
Assyrian calendar	4431
Balinese saka calendar	N/A
Bengali calendar	−913 – −912
Berber calendar	631
Buddhist calendar	225
Burmese calendar	−957
Byzantine calendar	5189–5190
Chinese calendar	庚子年 (Metal Rat); 2378 or 2171 — to — 辛丑年 (Metal Ox); 2379 or 2172
Coptic calendar	−603 – −602
Discordian calendar	847
Ethiopian calendar	−327 – −326
Hebrew calendar	3441–3442
- Hindu calendars
Vikram Samvat	−263 – −262
Shaka Samvat	N/A
Kali Yuga	2781–2782
Holocene calendar	9681
Iranian calendar	941 BP – 940 BP
Islamic calendar	970 BH – 969 BH
Javanese calendar	N/A
Julian calendar	N/A
Korean calendar	2014
Minguo calendar	2231 before ROC 民前2231年
Nanakshahi calendar	−1787
Thai solar calendar	223–224
Tibetan calendar	阳金鼠年 (male Iron-Rat) −193 or −574 or −1346 — to — 阴金牛年 (female Iron-Ox) −192 or −573 or −1345

Year 320 BC was a year of the pre-Julian Roman calendar. At the time, it was known as the Year of the Consulship of Cursor and Philo (or, less frequently, year 434 Ab urbe condita). The denomination 320 BC for this year has been used since the early medieval period, when the Anno Domini calendar era became the prevalent method in Europe for naming years.

== Events ==
=== By place ===
==== Macedonian Empire ====
- Alexander the Great's various generals control different parts of Alexander's empire. Ptolemy controls Egypt, Seleucus controls Babylon and Syria, Antipater and his son Cassander control Macedon and Greece, Antigonus controls Phrygia and other parts of Asia Minor, Lysimachus controls Thrace and Pergamum and Eumenes controls the Cappadocia and Pontus areas.
- Judea and Syria are annexed by Ptolemy and he gives Judea a large measure of self-government.
- Eudemus makes himself master of the territories of the Indian king Porus, and treacherously puts that monarch to death.

=== By topic ===
==== Biology ====
- Theophrastus begins the systematic study of botany.

==== Demography ====
- Alexandria in Macedonian Egypt becomes the largest city of the world, taking over the lead from Babylon in Macedonian Babylonia.

== Births ==
- Timocharis of Alexandria, Greek astronomer responsible for the first recorded observation of Mercury and the first star catalogue (d. 260 BC)
- Bindusara, the heir to the throne of the Mauryan Empire, is born. (d. 272 BC)

== Deaths ==
- Anaximenes of Lampsacus, Greek rhetorician and historian (b. c. 380 BC)
- Menaechmus, Greek mathematician and geometer
- Zoilus, Greek grammarian, cynic philosopher and literary critic from Amphipolis in Macedon (b. c. 400 BC)
