= 248 BC =

248 BC in various calendars
Gregorian calendar	248 BC; CCXLVIII BC
Ab urbe condita	506
Ancient Egypt era	XXXIII dynasty, 76
Pharaoh	Ptolemy II Philadelphus, 36
Ancient Greek Olympiad (summer)	133rd Olympiad (victor)¹
Assyrian calendar	4503
Balinese saka calendar	N/A
Bengali calendar	−841 – −840
Berber calendar	703
Buddhist calendar	297
Burmese calendar	−885
Byzantine calendar	5261–5262
Chinese calendar	壬子年 (Water Rat); 2450 or 2243 — to — 癸丑年 (Water Ox); 2451 or 2244
Coptic calendar	−531 – −530
Discordian calendar	919
Ethiopian calendar	−255 – −254
Hebrew calendar	3513–3514
- Hindu calendars
Vikram Samvat	−191 – −190
Shaka Samvat	N/A
Kali Yuga	2853–2854
Holocene calendar	9753
Iranian calendar	869 BP – 868 BP
Islamic calendar	896 BH – 895 BH
Javanese calendar	N/A
Julian calendar	N/A
Korean calendar	2086
Minguo calendar	2159 before ROC 民前2159年
Nanakshahi calendar	−1715
Seleucid era	64/65 AG
Thai solar calendar	295–296
Tibetan calendar	阳水鼠年 (male Water-Rat) −121 or −502 or −1274 — to — 阴水牛年 (female Water-Ox) −120 or −501 or −1273

Year 248 BC was a year of the pre-Julian Roman calendar. In the Roman Republic at the time it was known as the Year of the Consulship of Cotta and Geminus (or, less frequently, year 506 Ab urbe condita). The denomination 248 BC for this year has been used since the early medieval period, when the Anno Domini calendar era became the prevalent method in Europe for naming years.

== Events ==
=== By place ===
==== China ====
- The Qin general Meng Ao captures the Wei cities of Gaodu and Ji.
- Meng Ao then annexes 37 towns and cities from the State of Zhao, conquering the cities of Yuci, Xincheng and Langmeng.

==== India ====
- The Mauryan king Ashoka is dedicated to the propagation of Buddhism and begins establishing monuments marking several significant sites in the life of Gautama Buddha.
