= Pausias =

Greek painter

Pausias (Greek: Παυσίας) was an ancient Greek painter of the first half of the 4th century BCE, of the school of Sicyon.

== Biography ==
Pausias introduced the custom of painting ceilings of houses. His great merit appears to have lain in the better rendering of foreshortening. The words in which Pliny describes a bull painted by him should be quoted:

Wishing to display the length of the bull's body, he painted it from the front, not in profile, and yet fully indicated its measure. Again, while others fill in with white the highlights, and paint in black what is less salient, he painted the whole bull of dark colour, and gave substance to the shadow out of the shadow itself, with great skill making his figures stand out from a flat background, and indicating their shape when foreshortened.

— Pliny.

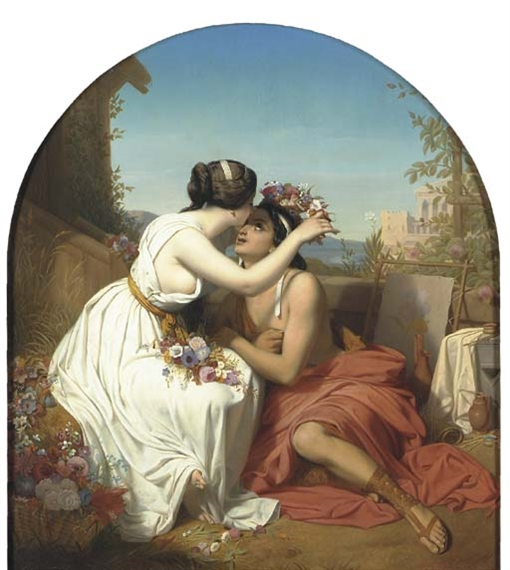
Pausias and Glycera by Godfried Guffens

Pausias is thought to have invented the encaustic painting method. He was proud of being able to finish a picture in just 24 hours. His most famous work was of a bull called A Sacrifice improved by his son Aristolaos. The Porticus Pompei at Rome contained this large painting by Pausias.

In Pausanias' Description of Greece some wall paintings by Pausias are mentioned. In the Tholos at Epidaurus, there was a painting of Eros laying down his bow and arrow to pick up his lyre. There was also a painting portraying the allegorical figure of Drunkenness as a woman, drinking wine from a crystal goblet with her face showing through the goblet.

Pausias painted a portrait of Glycera, a flower girl of his native city, with whom he had fallen in love as a young man. He tried in his portrait to imitate the flowers, which she used to make the garlands that she sold. The effort turned him into a very able flower painter. His picture of Glycera with a garland was known in Pliny the Elder's time as the Stephaneplocos (garland-weaver) or Stephanepolis (garland-seller). A copy of this picture (apogra-phon) was bought by Lucullus at the Dionysia at Athens for a large sum.
