= Nicocles of Sicyon =

Greek tyrant of Sicyon (ruled 251 BC)

Nicocles (Greek: Νικοκλῆς; ruled 251 BC) was a tyrant of the ancient Greek city-state of Sicyon in the 3rd century BC; to which position he raised himself in 251 BC by the murder of Paseas, who had succeeded his son Abantidas in the sovereign power. He had reigned only four months, during which period he had already driven into exile eighty of the citizens, when the citadel of Sicyon (which had narrowly escaped falling into the hands of the Aetolians shortly before) was surprised in the night by a party of Sicyonian exiles, headed by young Aratus. The palace of the tyrant was set on fire, but Nicocles himself made his escape by a subterranean passage, and fled from the city. Of his subsequent fortunes nothing is known.
