= Melanthius =

4th-century BC Greek painter

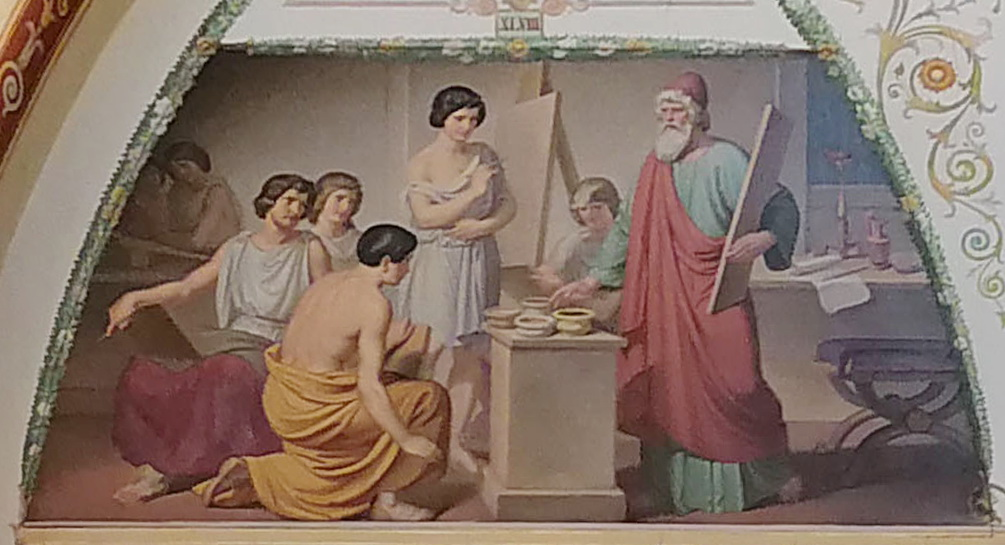

Melanthius (Ancient Greek: Μελάνθιος) was an ancient Greek painter of the 4th century BC. He belonged to the school of Sicyon, which was noted for fine drawing.
