= Paseas =

Tyrant of Greek city-state of Sicyon (died 251 BC)

Paseas (Πασέας) was a tyrant of the ancient Greek city-state of Sicyon in the 3rd century BC. He succeeded his son, Abantidas, in 252 BC. However, he was assassinated by Nicocles in 251 BC.

He is not to be confused with Paseas, the Ancient Greek vase painter.
