= Sicyon =

Ancient Greek city

Coordinates: 37.984104°N 22.711145°E

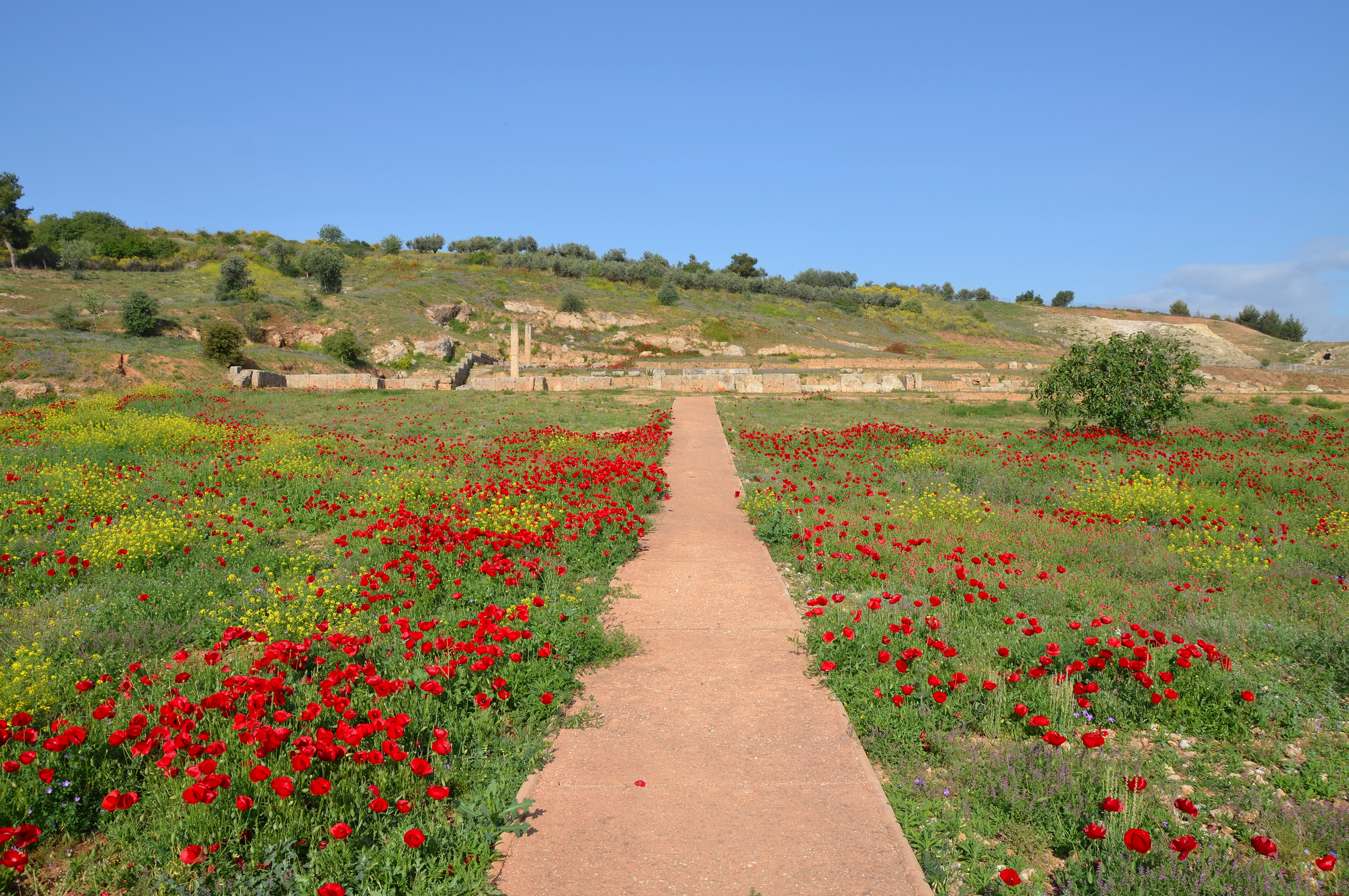
Ruins of Sicyon

Sicyon or Sikyon (/ˈsɪkiˌɒn/ or /ˈsɪsiˌɒn/; Ancient Greek: Σικυών) was an ancient Greek city state situated in the northern Peloponnesus between Corinth and Achaea on the territory of the present-day regional unit of Corinthia. The remains lie just west of the modern village of Sikyona (previously Vasiliko). An ancient monarchy at the times of the Trojan War, the city was ruled by a number of tyrants during the Archaic and Classical period and became a democracy in the 3rd century BC.

In Archaic times it was one of the most powerful city-states of the Greek world. Sicyon was celebrated over many centuries for its contributions to ancient Greek art, producing many famous painters and sculptors. In Hellenistic times it was also the home of Aratus of Sicyon, the leader of the Achaean League.

The site is undergoing continuing archaeology under the Sikyon project.

== Ancient history ==
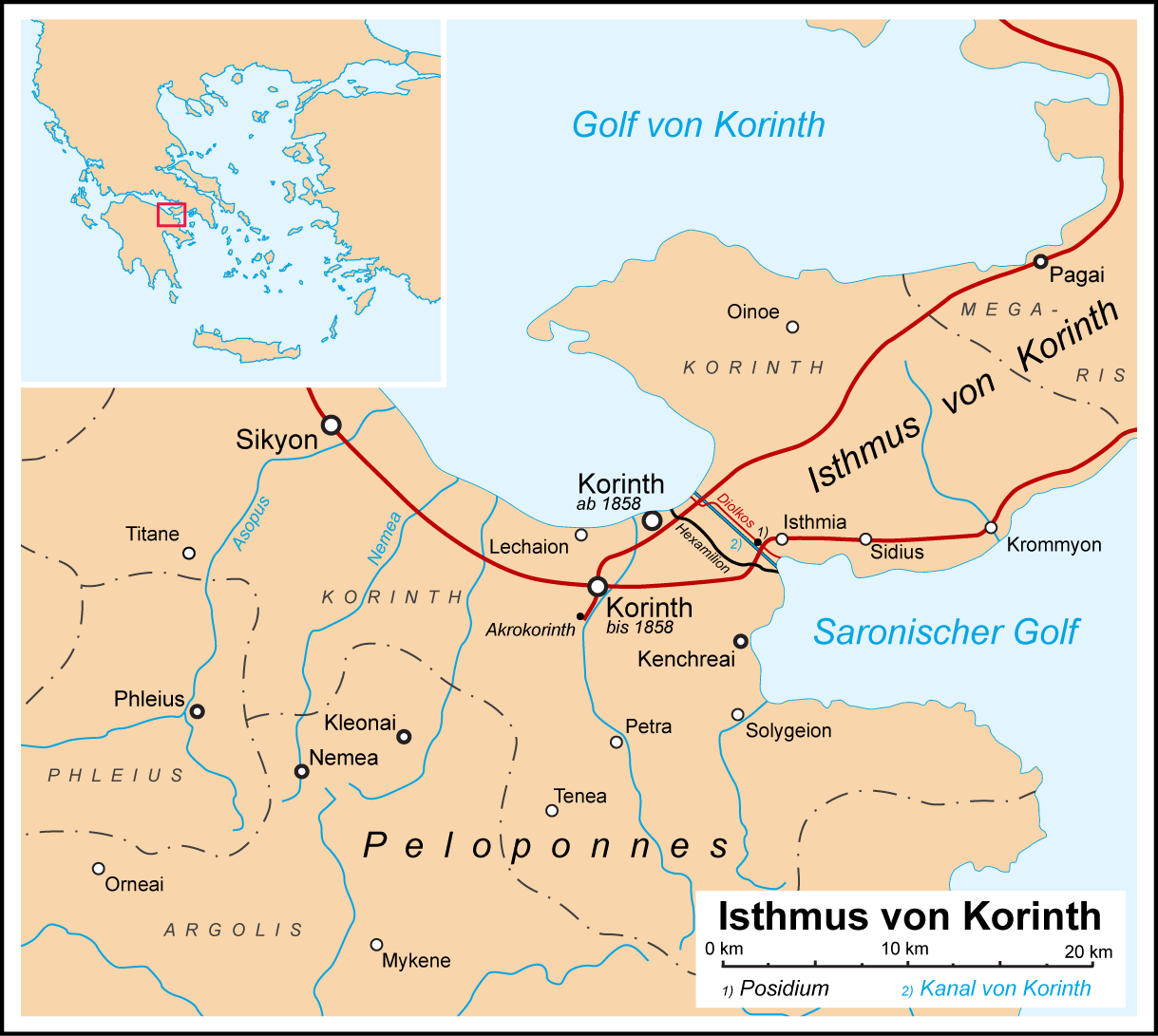
Location of Sicyon

Map of ancient Sicyonia

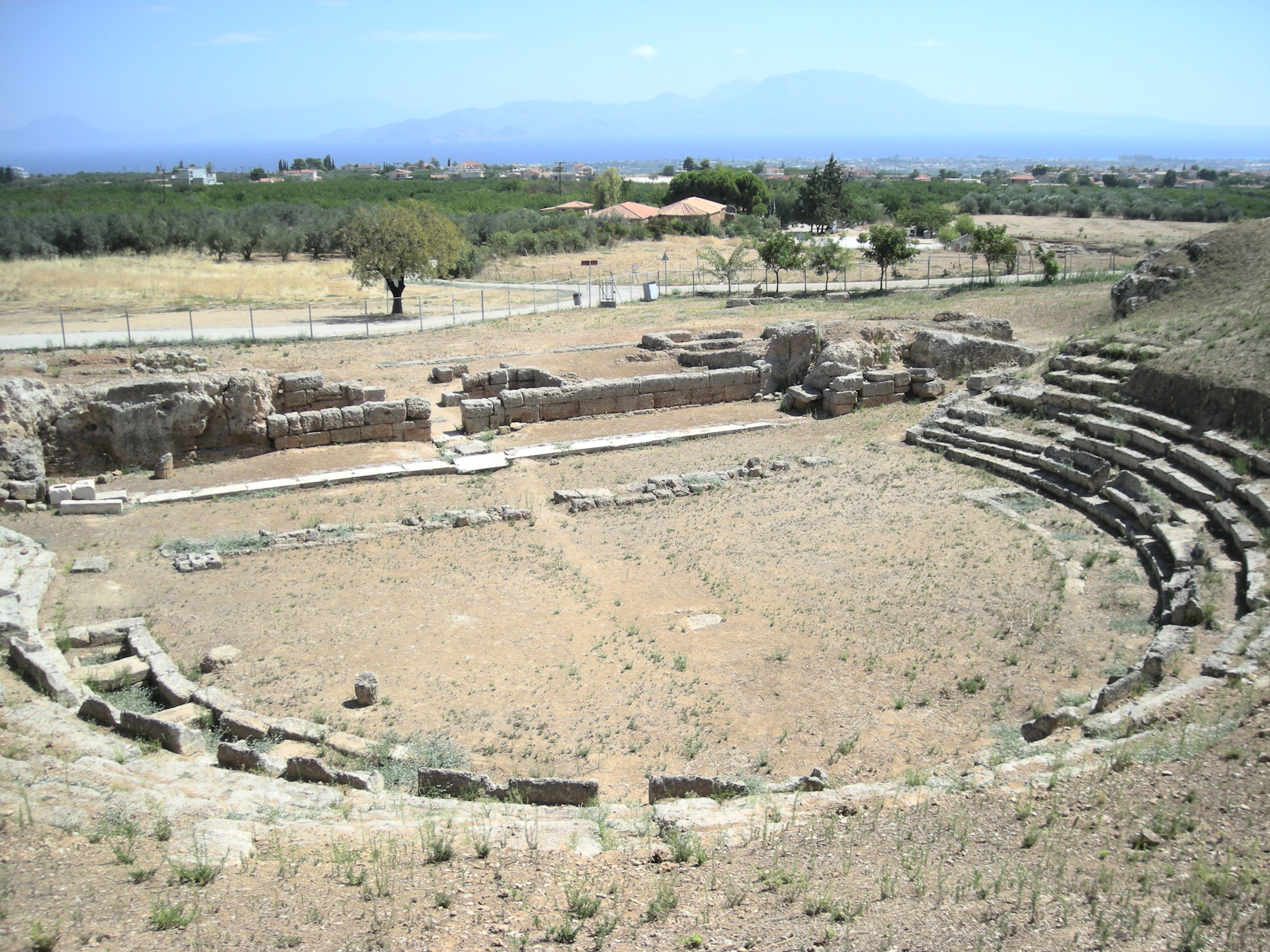
The ancient theatre of Sikyon today

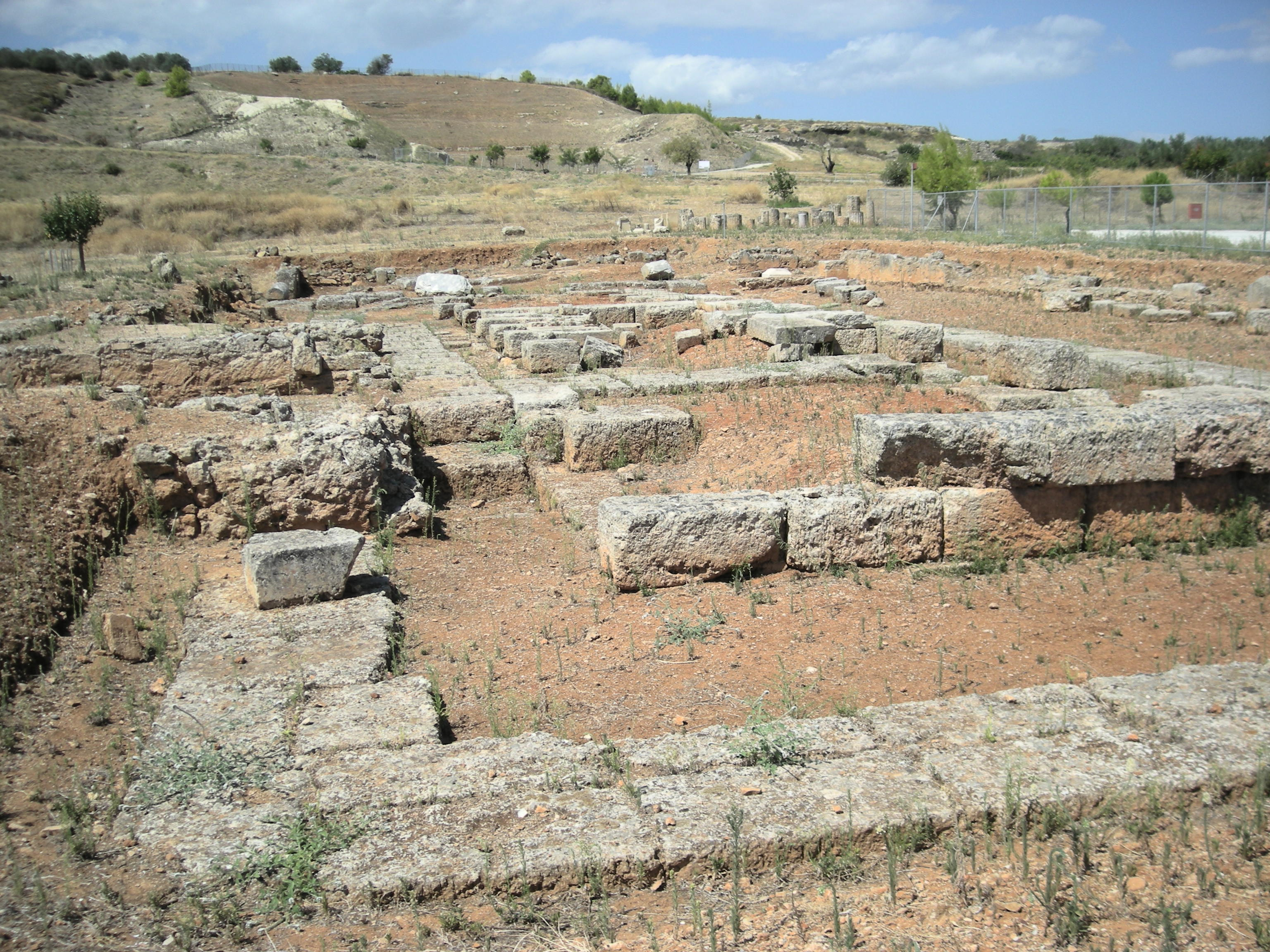
Excavation site of a Doric temple in Sikyon

The acropolis of Sicyon was built on a low triangular plateau about 3 km (two miles) from the Corinthian Gulf on which was originally located the city and port, according to ancient sources. Between the acropolis and the city lay a fertile plain with olive groves and orchards.

In Mycenean times, according to Eusebius, Sicyon had been ruled by a line of twenty-six mythical kings and then seven priests of Apollo. The king-list given by Pausanias comprises twenty-four kings, beginning with the autochthonous Aegialeus. The penultimate king of the list, Agamemnon, compelled the submission of Sicyon to Mycenae; after him came the Dorian usurper Phalces. Pausanias shared his source with Castor of Rhodes, who used the king-list in compiling tables of history; the common source was convincingly identified by Felix Jacoby as a lost Sicyonica by the late 4th-century poet Menaechmus of Sicyon.

The community was divided into the ordinary three Dorian tribes and an equally privileged tribe of Ionians, besides which a class of serfs (κορυνηφόροι, korynēphóroi or κατωνακοφόροι, katōnakophóroi) lived on and worked the land.

For some centuries the suzerainty of Argos remained, but after 676 BC Sicyon regained its independence under a line of tyrants called the Orthagorides after the name of the first ruler Orthagoras. The most important however was the founder's grandson Cleisthenes, the grandfather of the Athenian legislator Cleisthenes, who ruled from 600 to 560 BC. Besides reforming the city's constitution to the advantage of the Ionians and replacing Dorian cults with the worship of Dionysus, Cleisthenes gained a reputation as the chief instigator and general of the First Sacred War (590 BC) in the interests of the Delphians.

His successor Aeschines was expelled by the Spartans in 556 BC and Sicyon became an ally of the Lacedaemonians for more than a century. During this time, the Sicyonians developed the various industries for which they were known in antiquity. As the abode of the sculptors Dipoenus and Scyllis it gained pre-eminence in woodcarving and bronze work such as is still to be seen in the archaic metal facings found at Olympia. Its pottery, which resembled Corinthian ware, was exported with the latter as far as Etruria. In Sicyon also the art of painting was supposed to have been invented. After the fall of the tyrants their institutions survived until the end of the 6th century BC, when Dorian supremacy was re-established, perhaps by the agency of Sparta under the ephor Chilon, and the city was enrolled in the Peloponnesian League. Henceforth, its policy was usually determined either by Sparta or Corinth.

During the Persian Wars, the Sicyonians participated with fifteen triremes in the Battle of Salamis and with 3,000 hoplites in the Battle of Plataea. On the Delphic Serpent Column celebrating the victory Sicyon was named in fifth place after Sparta, Athens, Corinth and Tegea. In September 479 BC a Sicyonian contingent fought bravely in the Battle of Mycale, where they lost more men than any other city.

Later in the 5th century BC, Sicyon, like Corinth, suffered from the commercial rivalry of Athens in the western seas, and was repeatedly harassed by squadrons of Athenian ships. The Sicyonians fought two battles against the Athenians, first against their admiral Tolmides in 455 BC and then in a land battle against Pericles with 1000 hoplites in 453 BC.

In the Peloponnesian War Sicyon followed the lead of Sparta and Corinth. When these two powers quarrelled during the peace of Nicias, it remained loyal to the Spartans. At the reprise of the war, during the Athenian expedition in Sicily, the Sicyonians contributed 200 pressed hoplites under their commander Sargeus to the force that relieved Syracuse. At the beginning of the 4th century, in the Corinthian war, Sicyon sided again with Sparta and became its base of operations against the allied troops round Corinth.

In 369 BC Sicyon was captured and garrisoned by the Thebans in their successful attack on the Peloponnesian League. From 368 to 366 BC Sicyon was ruled by Euphron who first favoured democracy, but then made himself tyrant. Euphron was killed in Thebes by a group of Sicyonian aristocrats, but his compatriots buried him in his home town and continued to honour him like the second founder of the city.

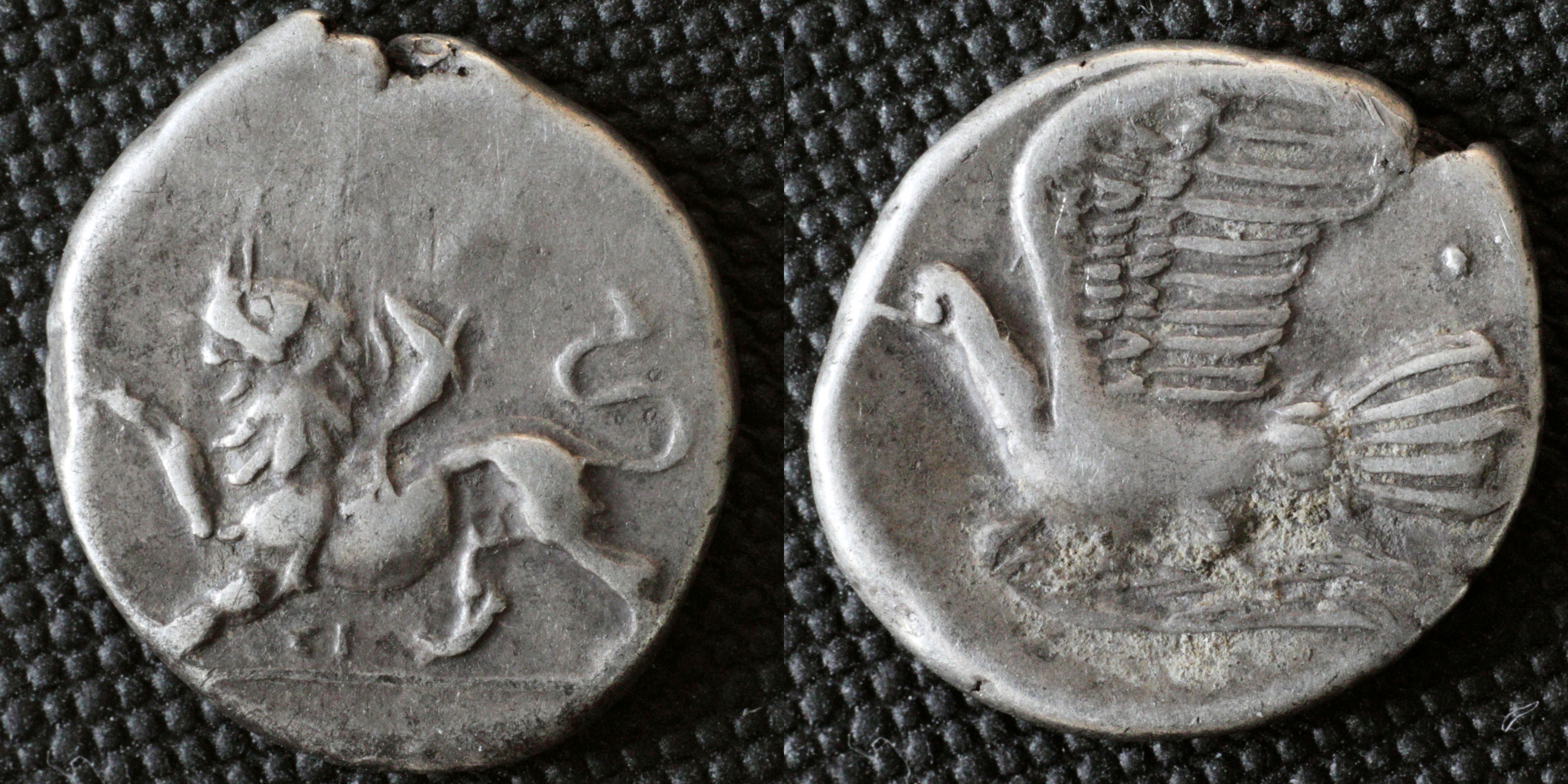

First side of the image: O: walking chimera; ΣΙ below
Second side of the image: R:flying dove; pellet above
silver hemidrachm struck in Sicyon 360–330 BC ref.: BMC 124, Sear sg2774, SNG Cop. 64/65

During the 4th century BC, the city reached its zenith as a centre of art: its school of painting gained fame under Eupompus and attracted the great masters Pamphilus and Apelles as students, while Lysippus and his pupils raised the Sicyonian sculpture to a level hardly surpassed anywhere else in Greece. The tyrant Aristratus, a friend of the Macedonian royal family, had himself portrayed by the painter Melanthius aside the goddess of victory Nike on a chariot. In this period Sicyon was the undisputed center of Greek painting with its school attracting famous artists from all over Greece, including the celebrated Apelles and Pausias.

In 323 BC Euphron the Younger, a grandson of the tyrant Euphron, reintroduced a democracy, but was soon conquered by the Macedonians during the Lamian War. When the Macedonian commander Alexander was murdered in Sicyon in 314 BC, his wife Cratesipolis took control of the city and ruled it for six years, until she was induced by king Ptolemy I to hand it over to the Egyptians. Between 308 and 303 BC Sicyon was ruled by two Ptolemaic commanders, first Cleonides and then Philip.

In 303 BC Sicyon was conquered by Demetrius Poliorcetes who razed the ancient city in the plain and transferred it to the acropolis, building a new wall there. The new agora was adorned by a "Painted Stoa" attributed to the king's mistress Lamia, a flute player. For a short time the town was now called "Demetrias", but eventually the old name prevailed. Demetrius left a garrison in the castle to control the city, and the commander Cleon established another tyrannical regime. After some twenty years he was killed by two rivals, Euthydemus and Timocleidas, who became the new joint tyrants of Sicyon. Their rule ended, probably around the start of the Chremonidean War in 267 BC, when they were expelled by the people who elected their leader Cleinias to govern the city on a democratic ground. Two magistrates of these years were the hieromnemoi Sosicles and Euthydamos, known from an inscription at Delphi. The democratic government's most important achievement was the construction of the gymnasium which is attributed to Cleinias. During the same time Xenokrates of Sicyon published his history of art which contributed to spreading the fame of Sicyon as an undisputed capital of ancient art.

Even this time democracy did not last more than a few years, and in 264 BC Cleinias was slain by his cognate Abantidas, who established his tyranny for twelve years. In 252 BC Abantidas was murdered by two rhetoricians, Aristotle the Dialectician and Deinias of Argos, and his father Paseas took over, only to be murdered after a short rule by another rival named Nicocles.

In 251, Aratus of Sicyon, the 20-year-old son of Cleinias, conquered the city with a night assault and expelled the last tyrant. Aratus re-established democracy, called back the exiles and brought his city into the Achaean League. This move ended the internal strife and Aratus remained the leading figure of Achaean politics until his death in 213 BC, during a period of great achievements. The prosperity and peaceful condition of Sicyon was only interrupted by an Aetolian raid in 241 BC and an unsuccessful siege at the hands of king Cleomenes III of Sparta in early 224 BC.

As a member of the Achaean federation Sicyon remained a stable democracy until the dissolution of the League by the Romans in 146 BC. In this period Sicyon was damaged by two disastrous earthquakes in 153 BC and 141 BC.

The destruction of Corinth (146 BC) brought Sicyon an acquisition of territory and the presidency over the Isthmian games; yet in Cicero's time it had fallen deep into debt. Under the Roman Empire it was quite obscured by the restored cities of Corinth and Patrae; in Pausanias' age (150 AD) it was almost desolate.

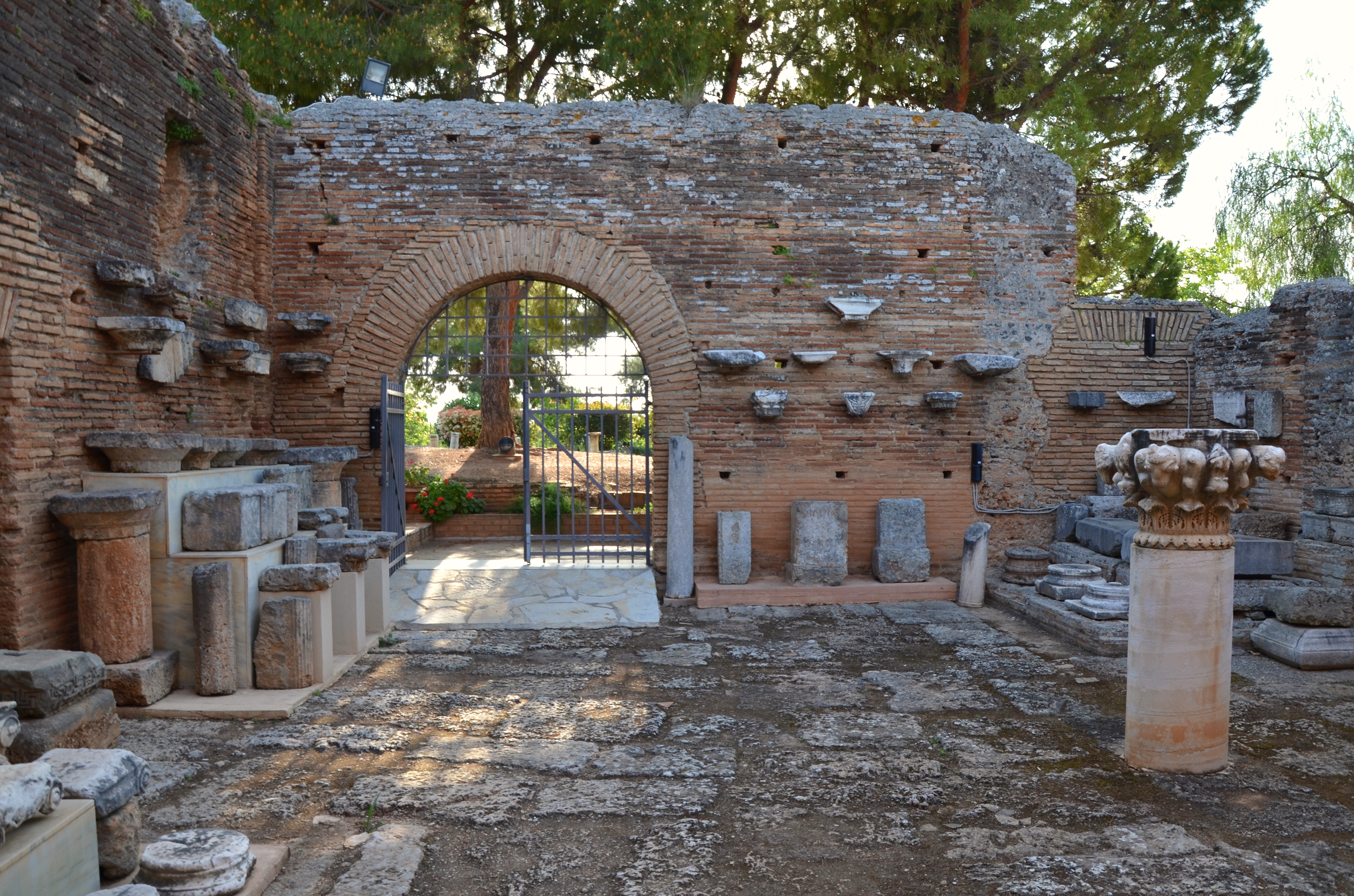
Roman baths

Nevertheless recent archaeology has found Roman shops destroyed in an earthquake dating to 400 AD.

== Ancient monuments ==
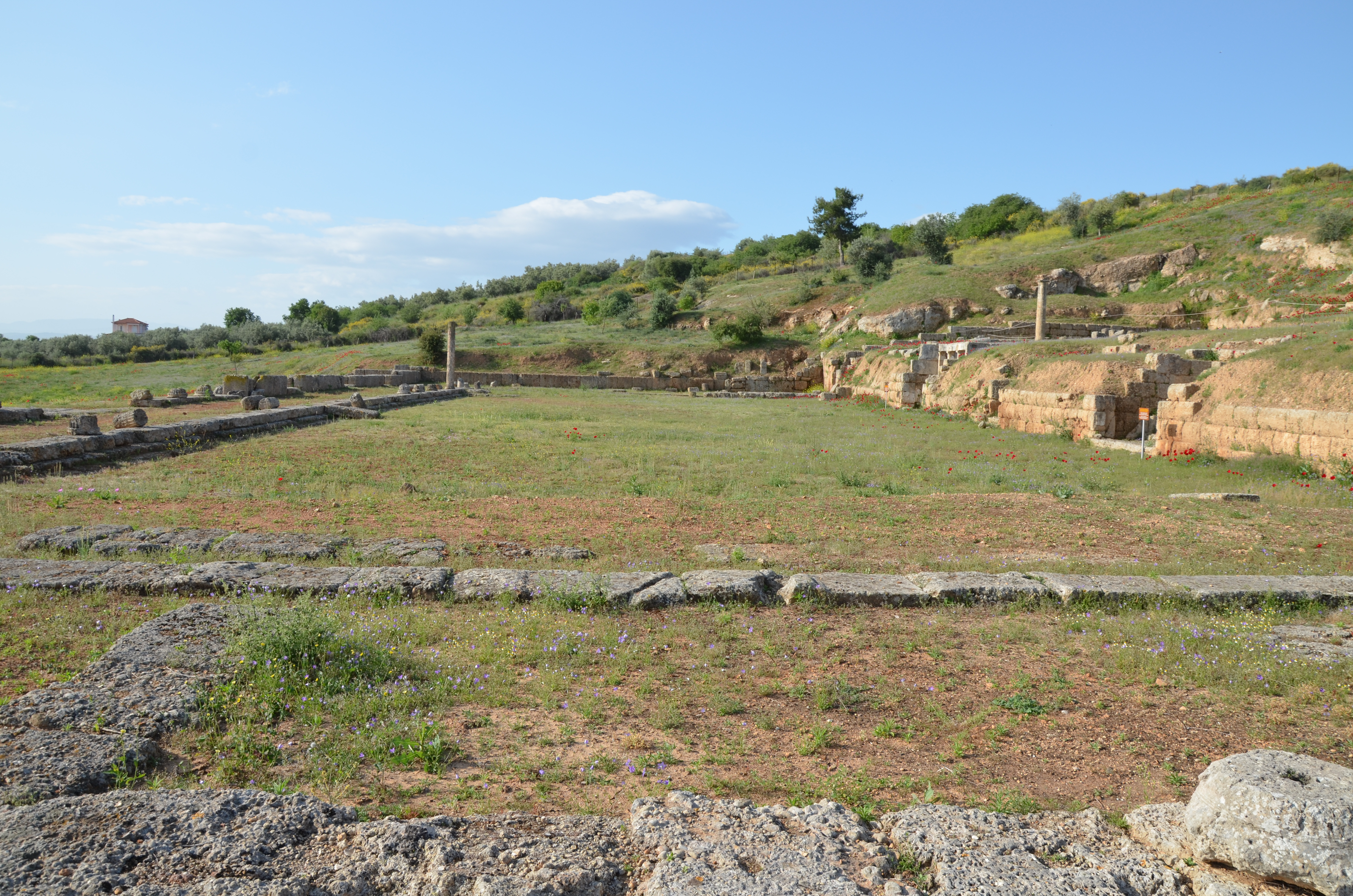
Agora

- Temple of Apollo or Artemis
- Theatre
- Palaestra - Gymnasium
- Stadium
- Bouleuterion
- West stoa
- South stoa
- Roman baths

== Medieval history ==
During the early Middle Ages, Sikyon continued to decline. It became a bishop's seat and, judging by its later designation "Hellas," it appears to have become a haven for populations seeking refuge from the settlement of Slavic groups in Greece during the 7th century. Following the Fourth Crusade, the settlement, then known as Vasilika (Basilikata), came under the control of the Principality of Achaia and became part of the prince's domain. A castle was erected atop the ruined ancient acropolis by Prince William of Villehardouin (1246–1278), to complement the defenses of Corinth. By 1369, many villages in the vicinity of Vasilika were abandoned due to the raids of Turkish pirates. Together with Corinth, Vasilika was acquired by the Florentine in Angevin service Niccolò Acciaioli, from whom it passed to Donato Acciaioli in 1362. Donato's son Angelo Acciaioli mortgaged Corinth and Vasilika to his cousin Nerio I Acciaioli, the future duke of Athens, by 1372. When Nerio died in 1394, Corinth and Vasilika were inherited by his daughter, Francesca Acciaioli, who had recently married Carlo I Tocco, the count palatine of Cephalonia and Zante. These provisions were contested by Nerio's other daughter, Bartolomea Acciaioli, and her husband, Despot Theodore I Palaiologos of the Morea. Following the ensuing conflict, Francesca and Carlo were only able to retain Vasilika and Megara, while Corinth passed to the Despot Theodore. Finally, Despot Theodore II Palaiologos of the Morea seized Vasilika in 1427, alongside other gains from the Principality of Achaia. The Ottoman Turks invaded and subjugated Corinth and Vasilika, alongside other northern Moreot towns and fortresses, in 1458, two years before completing the conquest of the Morea in 1460–1461.

A village named until 1920 Vasiliko (described by the 1911 Encyclopædia Britannica as "insignificant") lies next to the site of ancient and medieval Sikyon. It is now named Sikyona, reflecting the name of the ancient city.

== Mythological rulers ==
Kings largely according to Eusebius's chronicle and other Greco-Roman sources are:

1. Aegialeus
2. Europs
3. Telchis
4. Apis of Sicyon
5. Thelxion of Sicyon
6. Aegyrus
7. Thurimachus
8. Leucippus
9. Messapus
10. Eratus
11. Plemnaeus
12. Orthopolis
13. Marathonius or Coronus
14. Marathus
15. Echyreus or alternatively Coronus (which claims descent from Orthopolis according to Pausanias)
16. Corax
17. Epopeus of Sicyon
18. Lamedon
19. Sicyon
20. Polybus of Sicyon (succeeded by Adrastus according to Pausanias)
21. Inachus
22. Phaestus
23. Adrastus
24. Zeuxippus of Sicyon (some sources see as direct succession of Phaestus)
25. Pelasgus
26. Polypheides, lord Before Agammemnon

Seven priests of Apollo Carneius ruled that follow these kings as rulers according to Eusebius are:

1. Archelaus, who ruled one year.
2. Automedon, one year.
3. Theoclytus, four years.
4. Euneus, six years.
5. Theonomus, nine years.
6. Amphigyes, twelve years.
7. Charidemus, one year. He could not bear the expense, and went into exile. He was priest 352 years before the first Olympiad (i.e. 1128 BCE).

The list of Orthagorides goes as follows:

- Orthagoras:founder of the dynasty Fought in the city of Pellene
- Myron: Won the 648 Olympic Games
- Aristonymos:Reigned briefly
- Myron II::debauched, was murdered
- Isodeme:dethroned after two years of reign
- Cleisthenes:The most famous member of the dynasty, he died childless, ending the dynasty.

== Notable people ==
Ancient

- Aegialeus (21st century BC) legendary founder
- Tellis (8th century BC), runner (Olympic victor 708 BC)
- Butades (7th century BC) sculptor
- Canachus (6th century BC) sculptor
- Aristocles (5th century BC) sculptor
- Praxilla (5th century BC) poet
- Ariphron (5th century BC) poet
- Alypus (5th to 4th century BC) sculptor
- Alexis (5th or 4th century BC) sculptor
- Eupompus (4th century BC) painter
- Pamphilus (4th century BC) painter
- Melanthius (4th century BC) painter
- Pausias (4th century BC) painter
- Eutychides (4th century BC) sculptor
- Lysippos (4th century BC) sculptor
- Lysistratus (4th century BC) sculptor
- Sostrates (4th century BC) pankratiast (thrice Olympic champion)
- Canachus the Younger (4th century BC) sculptor
- Xenokrates (3rd century BC) sculptor and art historian
- Machon (3rd century BC) playwright
- Timanthes (3rd century BC) painter
- Nealkes (3rd century BC) painter
- Anaxandra (3rd century BC) painter
- Pythocles (3rd century BC), runner (Olympic victor 236 BC)
- Aratus of Sicyon (271–213 BC) strategos of the Achaean League
- Baccheidas, a dancer and teacher of music
- Daetondas of Sicyon, sculptor who made a statue of an Elean boxing athlete Theotimus
- Bycelus, Olympic victor, who was the first Sicyonian to win the boys' boxing-match.

Modern

- Sotirios Krokidas, jurist and PM

== Mythology: Identification with Mecone ==
Sicyon has been traditionally identified with the mythical Mecone or Mekone, site of the trick at Mecone carried out by Prometheus. Mecone is also described by Callimachus as "the seat of the gods", and as the place where the brother deities Zeus, Poseidon and Hades cast lots for what part of the world each would rule.

== Mentions in literary works ==
In the 4th century BC the people of Sicyon were the subject of a popular comedy by Menander titled Sikyonioi.

William Shakespeare, in his 1606 play Antony and Cleopatra (Act I, Scene 2), notes that Marc Antony's wife, Fulvia died in Sicyon. Historically, she died there in 40 BC while in rebellion against Octavius Caesar.

Friedrich Hölderlin's novel Hyperion from 1797 starts at the "paradisiac plain of Sicyon".

== See also ==
- List of ancient Greek cities

== Bibliography ==
- Bon, A., La Morée franque. Recherches historiques, topographiques et archéologiques sur la principauté d'Achaïe, Bibliothèques de l'Ecole française d'Athènes et de Rome - Série Athènes, 1969.
- Fine, J., The Late Medieval Balkans: A Critical Survey from the Late Twelfth Century to the Ottoman Conquest, Ann Arbor, 1987.
- Topping, P., The Morea, 1311–1364 and The Morea, 1364-1460, in K. Setton and H. W. Hazard (eds.), A History of the Crusades, vol. 3, Madison, 1975: 104-140 and 141-166.
