= Archaic Greece =

Period of ancient Greece from c. 800 to 480 BC

- Geographical range: Mediterranean Sea, Black Sea
- Period: Ancient Greece
- Dates: c. 800–480 BC
- Characteristics: Greek colonization
- Preceded by: Greek Dark Ages
- Followed by: Classical Greece

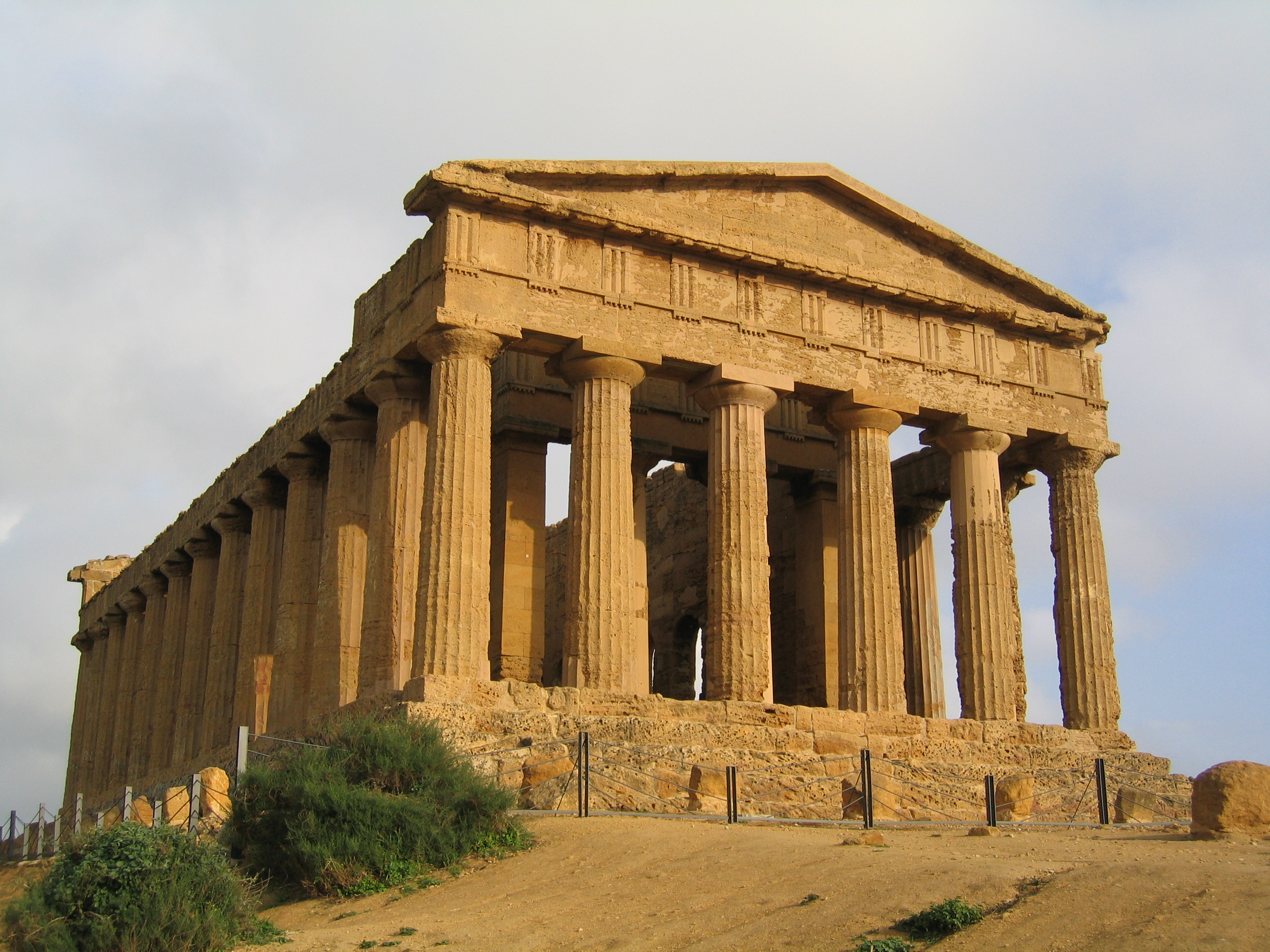
The Temple of Concordia, Valle dei Templi, Magna Graecia, in present-day Italy

Greek territories and colonies in the Archaic period

Archaic Greece was the period in Greek history lasting from c. 800 BC to the second Persian invasion of Greece in 480 BC, following the Greek Dark Ages and succeeded by the Classical period. In the archaic period, the Greeks settled across the Mediterranean Sea and the Black Sea: by the end of the period, they were part of a trade network that spanned the entire Mediterranean.

The archaic period began with a massive increase in the Greek population and significant changes that rendered the Greek world at the end of the 8th century entirely unrecognizable from its beginning. According to Anthony Snodgrass, the archaic period was bounded by two revolutions in the Greek world. It began with a "structural revolution" that "drew the political map of the Greek world" and established the poleis, the distinctively Greek city-states, and it ended with the intellectual revolution of the Classical period.

The archaic period saw developments in Greek politics, economics, international relations, warfare and culture. It laid the groundwork for the Classical period, both politically and culturally. It was in the archaic period that the Greek alphabet developed, the earliest surviving Greek literature was composed, monumental sculpture and red-figure pottery began in Greece and the hoplite became the core of Greek armies.

In Athens, the earliest institutions of democracy were implemented under Solon, and the reforms of Cleisthenes at the end of the archaic period brought in Athenian democracy as it was during the Classical period. In Sparta, many of the institutions credited to the reforms of Lycurgus were introduced during the archaic period, the region of Messenia was brought under Spartan control, helotage was introduced and the Peloponnesian League was founded and made Sparta a dominant power in Greece.

== Historiography ==
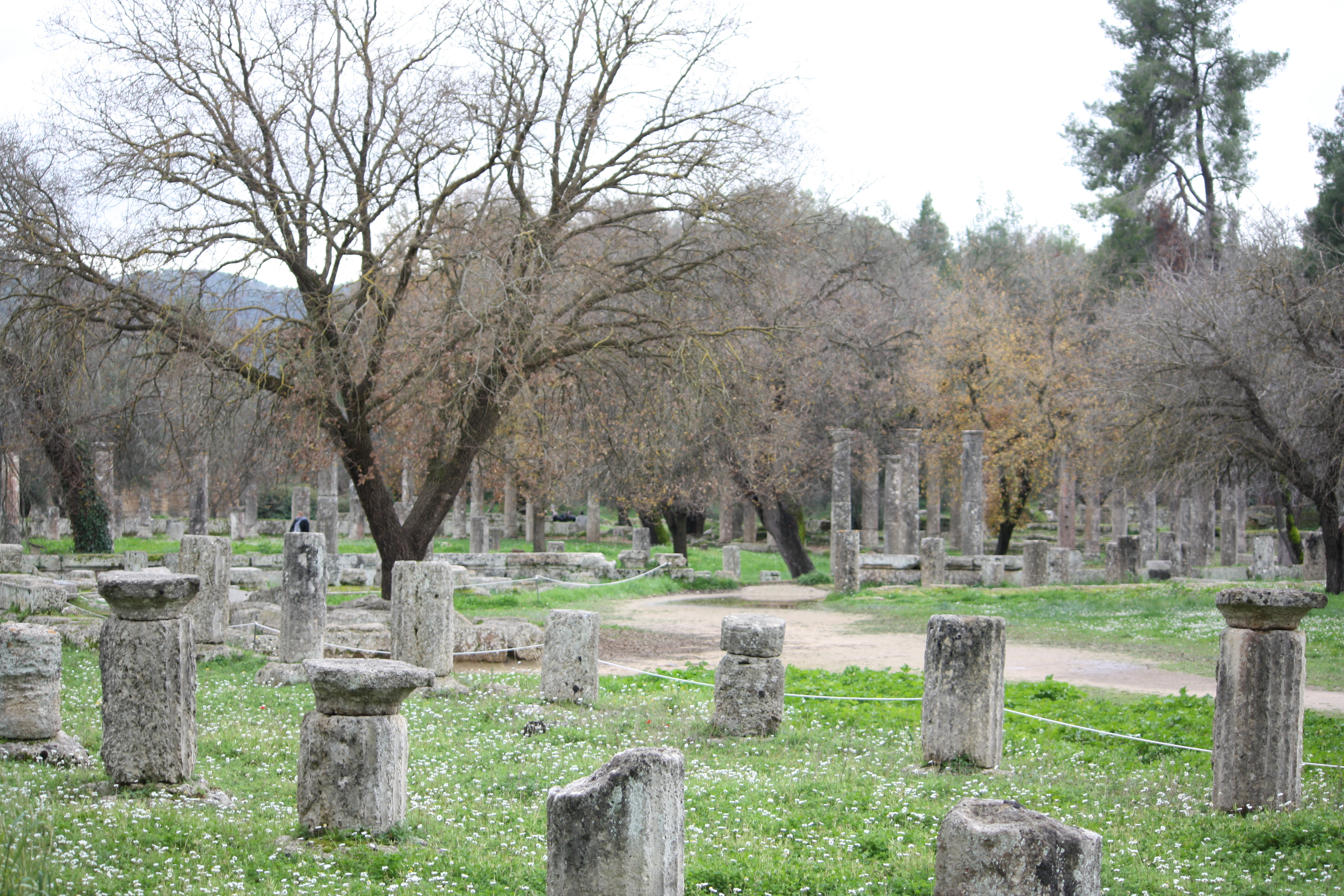
The gymnasium and palaestra at Olympia, the site of the ancient Olympic games. The archaic period conventionally dates from the first Olympiad.

The word archaic derives from the Greek word archaios, meaning 'old', and refers to the period in ancient Greek history before the classical period. The archaic period is generally thought of as lasting from the beginning of the 8th century BC until the beginning of the 5th century BC, with the foundation of the Olympic Games in 776 BC and the Second Persian invasion of Greece in 480 BC forming notional starting and ending dates. The archaic period was long considered less important and historically interesting than the classical period and was studied primarily as a precursor to it. More recently, archaic Greece has come to be studied for its own achievements. With this reassessment of the significance of the archaic period, some scholars have objected to the term archaic because of its connotations in English of being primitive and outdated. No term which has been suggested to replace it has gained widespread currency, however, and the term is still in use.

Much evidence about the Classical period of ancient Greece comes from written histories, such as Thucydides's History of the Peloponnesian War. By contrast, no such evidence survives from the archaic period. Surviving contemporary written accounts of life in the period are in the form of poetry. Other written sources from the archaic period include epigraphical evidence, including parts of law codes, inscriptions on votive offerings and epigrams inscribed on tombs. However, none of that evidence is in the quantity for which it survives from the classical period. What is lacking in written evidence is made up for in the rich archaeological evidence from the archaic Greek world. Indeed, although much knowledge of Classical Greek art comes from later Roman copies, all surviving archaic Greek art is original.

Other sources for the archaic period are the traditions recorded by later Greek writers such as Herodotus. However, those traditions are not part of any form of history that would be recognized today. Those transmitted by Herodotus were recorded whether or not he believed them to be accurate. Indeed, Herodotus did not even record any dates before 480 BC.

== Political developments ==
Politically, the archaic period saw the development of the polis (or city-state) as the predominant unit of political organization. Many cities throughout Greece came under the rule of autocratic leaders, called "tyrants". It also saw the development of law and systems of communal decision-making, with the earliest evidence for law codes and constitutional structures dating to the period. By the end of the archaic period, both the Athenian and Spartan constitutions seem to have developed into their classical forms.

=== Development of the polis ===
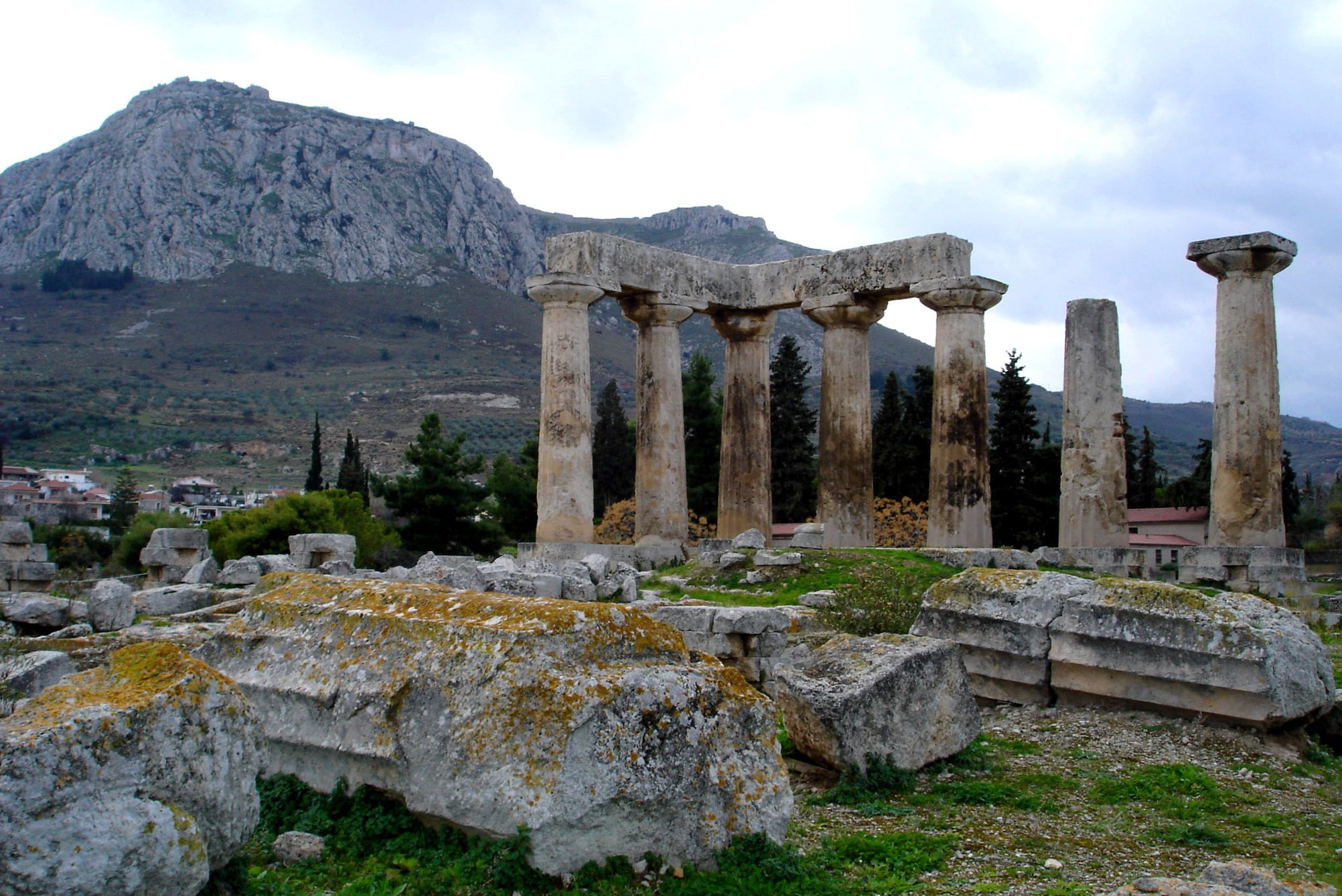
Ruins of the Temple of Apollo within the polis of Ancient Corinth, built c. 540 BC, with the Acrocorinth (the city's acropolis) seen in the background

The archaic period saw significant urbanization and the development of the concept of the polis as it was used in Classical Greece. By Solon's time, if not before, the word polis had acquired its classical meaning, and though the emergence of the polis as a political community was still in progress at this point, the polis as an urban centre was a product of the eighth century. However, the polis did not become the dominant form of socio-political organization throughout Greece in the archaic period, and in the north and west of the country it did not become dominant until some way into the Classical period.

The urbanization process in archaic Greece known as "synoecism" – the amalgamation of several small settlements into a single urban centre – took place in much of Greece in the eighth century BC. Both Athens and Argos, for instance, began to coalesce into single settlements around the end of that century. In some settlements, this physical unification was marked by the construction of defensive city walls, as was the case in Smyrna by the middle of the eighth century BC, and Corinth by the middle of the seventh century BC.

It seems that the evolution of the polis as a socio-political structure, rather than a simply geographical one, can be attributed to this urbanization, as well as a significant population increase in the eighth century. These two factors created a need for a new form of political organization, as the political systems in place at the beginning of the archaic period quickly became unworkable.

==== Athens ====
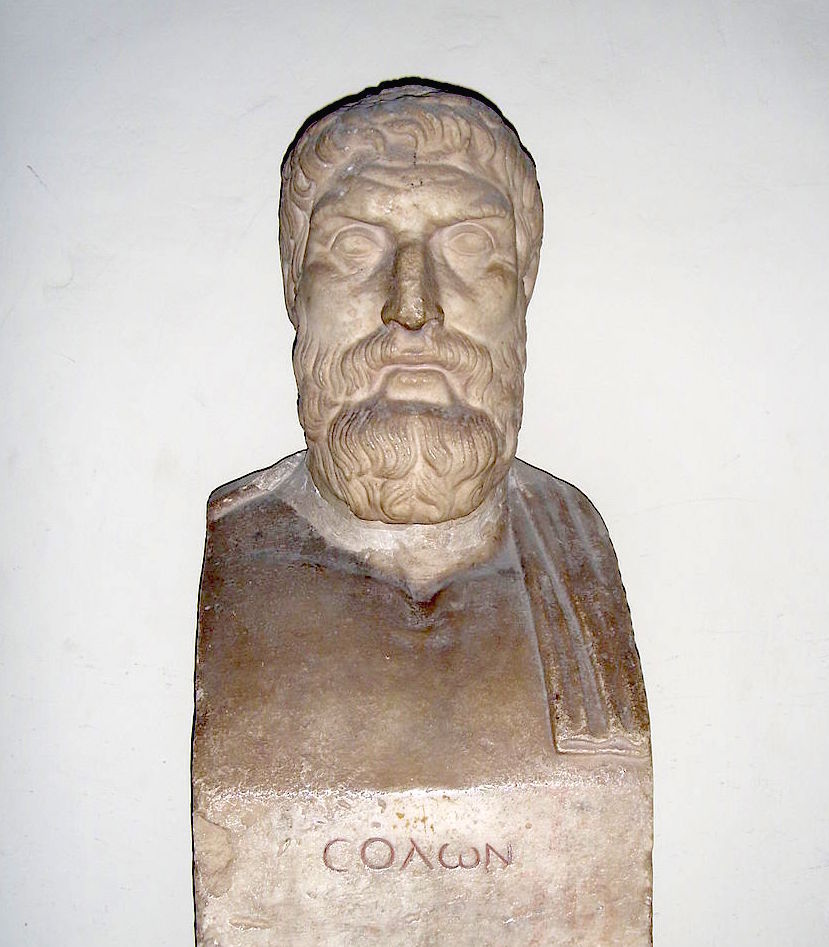
The lawgiver Solon reformed the Athenian constitution, which led to significant developments in Greece

Though in the early part of the Classical period the city of Athens was both culturally and politically dominant, it was not until the late sixth century BC that it became a leading power in Greece.

The attempted coup by Cylon of Athens (who became tyrant of Athens) may be the earliest event in Athenian history which is clearly attested by ancient sources, dating to around 636 BCE. At this time, it seems that Athens' monarchy had already ended and the archonship had replaced it as the most important executive office in the state, though the archonship could only be held by members of the Eupatridae, the families which made up Athens' aristocracy.

The earliest laws of Athens were established by Draco, in 621/0; his law on homicide was the only one to have survived to the Classical period. Draco's law code aimed to replace private revenge as the first and only response of an individual to an offence committed against them. The law code of Draco, however, failed to prevent the tensions between the rich and poor which were the impetus to Solon's reforms.

In 594/3 BC, Solon was appointed "archon and mediator". Exactly what his reforms consisted of is uncertain. He claimed to have taken up the horoi to set the land free, but the exact meaning of horoi is unknown; their removal seems to have been part of the problem of hektemoroi – another word whose meaning is obscure. Solon was also credited with abolishing slavery for debtors, and establishing limits on who could be granted Athenian citizenship.

Solon instituted radical constitutional reform, replacing noble birth as a qualification for office with income. The poorest – called thetes – could hold no offices, although they could attend the Assembly and the law courts, while the richest class – the pentacosiomedimni – were the only people eligible to become treasurer, and possibly archon. He set up the Council of the Four Hundred, responsible for discussing motions which were to come before the Assembly. Finally, Solon substantially reduced the powers of the archon by giving citizens the right of appeal; their case was judged by the Assembly.

A second wave of constitutional reform in Athens was instituted by Cleisthenes towards the end of the sixth century. Cleisthenes apparently redivided the Athenian population, which had previously been grouped into four tribes, into ten new tribes. A new Council of 500 was instituted, with members from each deme represented. Demes were also given the power to determine their own members (which, in turn, provided them with influence over the membership of the citizen body more generally) and to somewhat determine their own judicial arrangements. These reforms gave the citizen body a sense of responsibility for what happened in the community for the first time. Between the reforms of Solon and Cleisthenes, the Athenian constitution had become identifiably democratic.

==== Sparta ====
Sparta's constitution took on the form it would have in the Classical period during the eighth century BC. By the classical period, Spartan tradition attributed this constitution to Lycurgus of Sparta, who according to Thucydides lived a little over four centuries before the end of the Peloponnesian War, around the end of the ninth century. The First Messenian War, probably taking place from approximately 740 to 720 BC, saw the strengthening of the powers of the Gerousia against the assembly, and the enslavement of the Messenian population as Helots. Around the same time, the ephors gained the power to restrict the actions of the kings of Sparta. Thus by the late seventh century, Sparta's constitution had recognisably taken on its classical form.

From around 560 BC, Sparta began to build a series of alliances with other Greek states, which became the Peloponnesian League: by 550, cities such as Elis, Corinth, and Megara were part of the alliance. This series of alliances had the dual purpose of preventing the cities of the League from supporting the Helot population of Messenia, and of helping Sparta in its conflict with Argos, which in the archaic period was along with Sparta one of the major powers in the Peloponnese.

=== Colonization ===
In the eighth and seventh centuries BC, Greeks began to spread across the Mediterranean, the Sea of Marmara and the Black Sea. This was not simply for trade, but also to found settlements. These Greek colonies were not, as Roman colonies were, dependent on their mother-city, but were independent city-states in their own right.

Greeks settled outside of Greece in two distinct ways. The first was in permanent settlements founded by Greeks, which formed as independent poleis. The second form was in what historians refer to as emporia; trading posts which were occupied by both Greeks and non-Greeks and which were primarily concerned with the manufacture and sale of goods. Examples of this latter type of settlement are found at Al Mina in the east and Pithekoussai in the west.

The earliest Greek colonies were on Sicily. Many of these were founded by people from Chalcis, but other Greek states, such as Corinth and Megara were also responsible for early colonies in the area. By the end of the eighth century BC, Greek settlements in southern Italy were also well established. In the seventh century, Greek colonists expanded the areas that they settled. In the west, colonies were founded as far afield as Marseille. In the east, the north Aegean, the Sea of Marmara, and the Black Sea all saw colonies founded. The dominant colonizer in these parts was Miletus. At the same time, early colonies such as Syracuse and Megara Hyblaea began to themselves establish colonies.

In the west, Sicily and southern Italy were some of the largest recipients of Greek colonisers. So many Greek settlements were founded in southern Italy that it was known in antiquity as Magna Graecia – "Great Greece". In the last quarter of the eighth century, new Greek settlements were founded in Sicily and southern Italy at an average rate of one every other year, and Greek colonists continued to found cities in Italy until the mid-fifth century BC.

=== Tyranny ===
Archaic Greece from the mid-seventh century BC has sometimes been called an "Age of Tyrants". The word τύραννος (tyrannos, whence the English 'tyrant') first appeared in Greek literature in a poem of Archilochus, to describe the Lydian ruler Gyges. The earliest Greek tyrant was Cypselus, who seized power in Corinth in a coup in 655 BC. He was followed by a series of others in the mid-seventh century BC, such as Orthagoras in Sicyon and Theagenes in Megara.

Various explanations have been provided for the rise of tyranny in the seventh century BC. The most popular of these explanations dates back to Aristotle, who argued that tyrants were set up by the people in response to the nobility becoming less tolerable. As there is no evidence from the time that the nobility were becoming increasingly arrogant during the period, modern explanations of seventh century tyranny have tried to find other reasons for unrest among the people. For example, Robert Drews argues that tyrannies were set up by individuals who controlled private armies and that early tyrants did not need the support of the people at all, whilst N.G.L. Hammond suggests that tyrannies were established as a consequence of in-fighting between rival oligarchs, rather than between the oligarchs and the people.

Recently historians have begun to question the existence of a seventh century "age of tyrants". In the archaic period, the Greek word tyrannos, according to Victor Parker, did not have the negative connotations it had gained by the time Aristotle wrote his Constitution of the Athenians. When Archilochus used the word tyrant, it was synonymous with anax (an archaic Greek word meaning 'king'). Parker dates the first use of the word tyrannos in a negative context to the first half of the sixth century, at least fifty years after Cypselus took power in Corinth. It was not until the time of Thucydides that tyrannos and basileus ('king') were consistently distinguished. Similarly, Greg Anderson has argued that archaic Greek tyrants were not considered illegitimate rulers, and cannot be distinguished from any other rulers of the same period.

== Demography ==
The Greek population doubled during the eighth century, resulting in more and larger settlements than previously. The largest settlements, such as Athens and Knossos, might have had populations of 1,500 in 1000 BC; by 700 they might have held as many as 5,000 people. This was part of a wider phenomenon of population growth across the Mediterranean region at this time, which may have been caused by a climatic shift that took place between 850 and 750, which made the region cooler and wetter. This led to the expansion of population into uncultivated areas of Greece and was probably also a driver for colonization abroad.

Ancient sources give us little information on mortality rates in archaic Greece, but it is likely that not many more than half of the population survived to the age of 18: perinatal and infant mortality are likely to have been very high. The population of archaic Greece would have consequently been very young – somewhere between two-fifths and two-thirds of the population might have been under 18. By contrast, probably less than one in four people were over 40, and only one in 20 over the age of 60.

Evidence from human remains shows that the average age at death increased over the archaic period, but there is no clear trend for other measures of health. The size of houses gives some evidence for prosperity within society; in the eighth and seventh centuries, the average house size remained constant around 45–50 m^{2}, but the number of very large and very small houses increased, indicating increasing economic inequality. From the end of the seventh century, this trend reversed, with houses clustering closely around a growing average, and by the end of the archaic period the average house size had risen to about 125 m^{2}.

== Economy ==
=== Agriculture ===
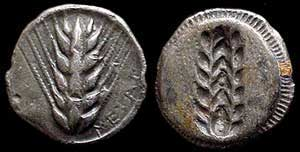
An ear of barley, symbol of wealth in the city of Metapontum in Magna Graecia (i.e. the Greek colonies of southern Italy), on a stamped stater, minted c. 530–510 BCE

Not all arable land in Greece was yet under cultivation in the archaic period. Farms appear to have been small, cohesive units, concentrated near settlements. They were highly diversified, growing a wide variety of crops simultaneously, in order to make consistent use of human resources throughout the year and to ensure that the failure of any one crop was not too much of a disaster. Crop rotation was practised, with fields left fallow every other year. Though wheat was preferred, in some parts of Greece barley was the staple grain; where wheat was grown it was durum rather than bread wheat. Alongside these, farmers cultivated pulses, vines, olives, fruit, and vegetables. Olives and grapes, which could be turned into oil and wine respectively, served as cash crops; farmers who cultivated land near population centres could also sell soft fruits and leafy vegetables at market.

Livestock were of secondary importance. Sheep and goats, in particular, were kept for meat, milk, wool, and fertilizer, but they were difficult to sustain and large herds were a sign of exceptional wealth. A team of oxen could increase agricultural output significantly but were expensive to maintain. As they had in the Dark Ages, the wealthiest members of Greek society could own large herds of cattle.

This pattern had probably developed before the beginning of the period and remained relatively consistent throughout it. The idea that it was preceded by a period of pastoralism and that agriculture only became dominant in the course of the archaic period is not supported by the archaeological or literary evidence. No technological innovations in agriculture appear to have occurred, except possibly the increased use of iron tools and more intensive use of manure.

The main source for the practice of agriculture in the period is Hesiod's Works and Days, which gives the impression of very small subsistence holdings in which the owner performed most of the labour personally; close reading reveals that much of the produce is to be sold for profit, much of the work to be performed by slaves (douloi or dmoes), and much of the owner's time to be spent away from the farm. Slaves' labour was supplemented by labourers who worked for a wage, as sharecroppers (called hektemoroi at Athens), or to pay off debts; this practice seems to have increased in the eighth century as the growth of the population increased the number of workers available, and intensified in the seventh century with the development of legally enforced debts and the status of the labourers increasingly becoming a source of social strife.

=== Trade ===
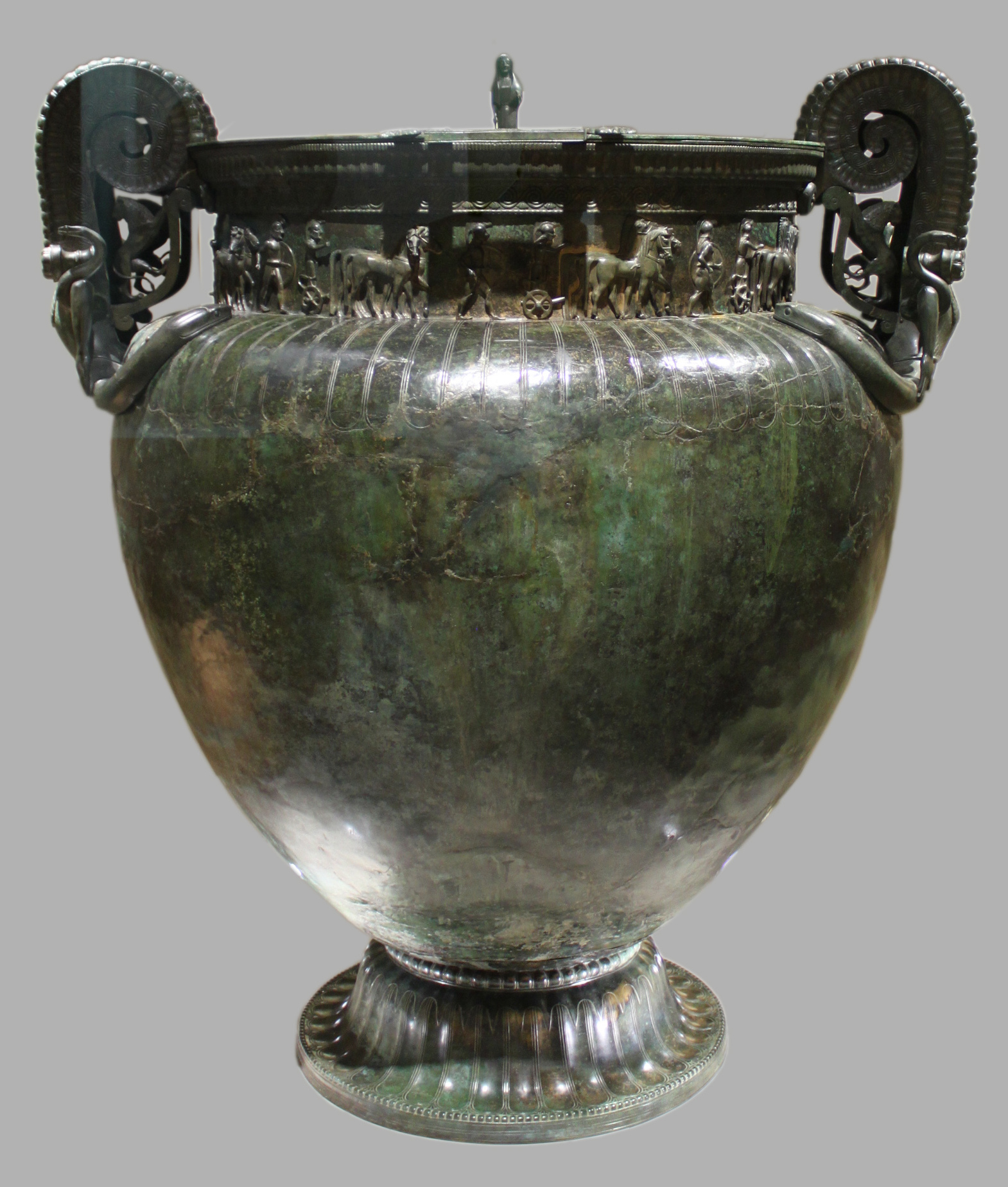
The Vix Krater, an imported Greek wine-mixing bronze vessel found in the Hallstatt/La Tène grave of the "Lady of Vix", Burgundy, France, c. 500 BC

By the late eighth century BC, the archaic Greek world had become involved in an active trade network around the Aegean. It was this trade network that was the source of the orientalizing influence on Greek art in the early part of the archaic period. Meanwhile, to the west, trade between Corinth and Magna Graecia in Southern Italy and Sicily was booming.

The eastern trade mainly involved the Greek islands, with Aegina, for instance, acting as an intermediary between the east and the Greek mainland. East Greek states would go on to become extremely prosperous through the sixth century due to the trade with Asia and Egypt. Of the mainland cities, those on the coast were the biggest recipients of trade from the east, especially Corinth.

In the early part of the archaic period, Athens does not seem to have been particularly actively involved in this eastern trade, and very few examples of eastern imports have been found in Athens from the eighth or early seventh centuries. By contrast, nearby Euboea had trade-links with the east as early as the first half of the eighth century, and the earliest pottery from the Greek islands found at Al Mina in modern Syria is from Euboea.

By the sixth century, Greece was part of a trade network spanning the entire Mediterranean. Sixth century Laconian pottery has been found as far afield as Marseille and Carthage to the west, Crete to the south and Sardis to the East.

=== Coinage ===
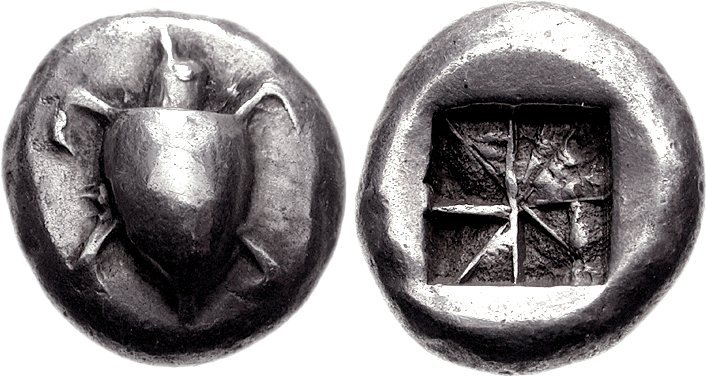
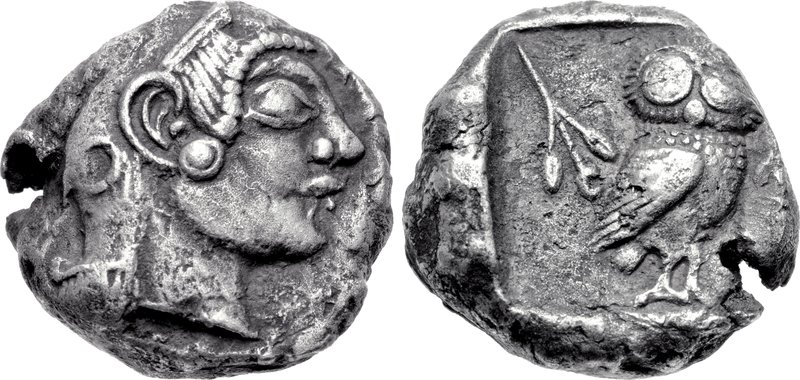
Coinage began to be adopted in Greece in the mid-6th century BC, beginning with Aegina, which minted distinctive "turtle coins" (above), before moving to other cities including Athens (below), whose coins were exported throughout the Greek world.

At the beginning of the archaic period, coinage had not yet been invented. The Greeks measured the value of objects or fines using certain valuable objects, such as oxen, tripods, and metal spits, as units of account. As in the Near East, precious metal bullion was used as a medium of exchange, principally gold at first, but mainly silver by the beginning of the sixth century. The weight of this bullion (often known as hacksilber) was measured using standard units, named for their value in terms of metal spits (obeloi) and handfuls (drachmai) of metal spits; these terms would later be used as names for Greek coin denominations.

Coinage was invented in Lydia around 650 BC. It was quickly adopted by Greek communities in western Asia Minor, although the older system of bullion remained in use as well. The island of Aegina began to issue its distinctive "turtle" coins before 550 BC, and from there coinage spread to Athens, Corinth and the Cycladic Islands in the 540s BC, Southern Italy and Sicily before 525 BC, and Thrace before 514 BC. Most of these coinages were very small and were mostly only used within the community that issued them, but the "turtles" of Aegina (from 530 or 520 BC) and the "owls" of Athens (from 515 BC) were issued in great quantity and exported throughout the Greek world.

The images on coins initially changed rapidly, but increasingly each community settled on a single image or set of images. Some of these were the symbol or image of an important deity in the city or visual puns on the city's name, but in many cases their meaning is obscure and may not have been chosen for any special reason.

The reasons for the rapid and widespread adoption of coinage by the Greeks are not entirely clear and several possibilities, which are not mutually exclusive, have been suggested. One possibility is the increased ease of commerce which coinage allowed. Coins were of standardised weights, which meant that their value could be determined without weighing them. Furthermore, it was not necessary for users of coinage to spend time determining whether the silver was pure silver; the fact that the coin had been issued by the community was a promise that it was worth a set value. Another possibility is that coinage was adopted specifically to enable communities to make payments to their citizens, mercenaries and artisans in a transparent, fair and efficient way. Similarly, when wealthy members of the community were required to contribute wealth to the community for festivals and the equipment of navies, coinage made the process more efficient and transparent. A third possibility, that coinage was adopted as an expression of a community's independence and identity, seems to be anachronistic.

== Culture ==
=== Art ===
In the visual arts, the archaic period is characterized by a shift towards representational and naturalistic styles. It was the period in which monumental sculpture was introduced to Greece, and in which Greek pottery styles went through great changes, from the repeating patterns of the late geometric period to the earliest red-figure vases. The early part of the archaic period saw distinctive orientalizing influences, both in pottery and in sculpture.

==== Sculpture ====
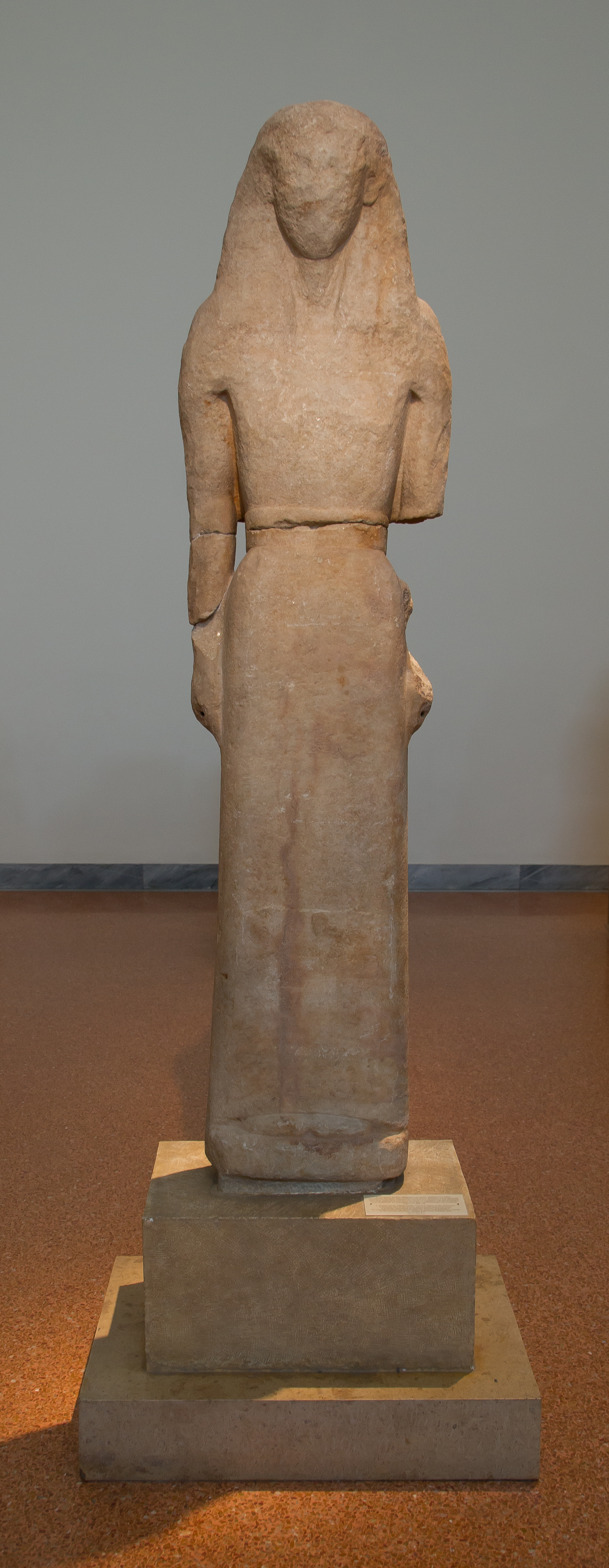
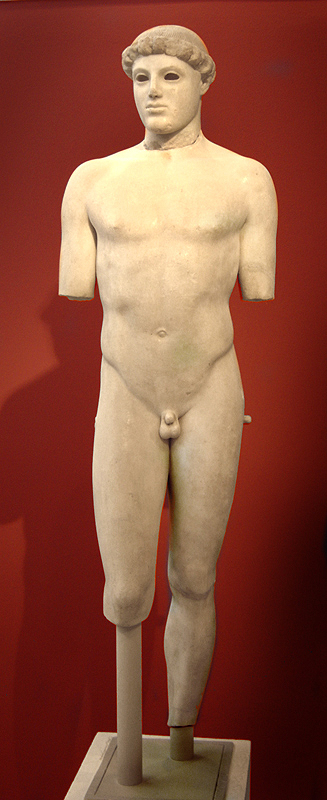
The Dedication of Nikandre (left) is probably the oldest kore to survive. 180 years after it was made, the genre was at an end, and Greek sculpture was recognizably Classical (right, the Kritios Boy).

At the beginning of the archaic period, Greek sculpture mostly consisted of small bronze works, particularly of horses. Bronze human figures were also produced, and both horse and human figures are primarily found in religious sanctuaries. Towards the end of the eighth century, horse figurines became much less common, disappearing "almost completely" by 700 BC. In the seventh century, Greek sculpture saw a strong Eastern influence, with mythical creatures such as griffins and sirens becoming much more popular. Also in the seventh century BC, Greek sculpture began to directly represent gods, a practice which had disappeared after the end of the Mycenaean period.

Life-size human sculpture in hard stone began in Greece in the archaic period. This was inspired in part by ancient Egyptian stone sculpture: the proportions of the New York Kouros exactly correspond to Egyptian rules about the proportion of human figures. In Greece, these sculptures best survive as religious dedications and grave markers, but the same techniques would have also been used to make cult images.

The best-known types of archaic sculpture are the kouros and kore, near life-size frontal statues of a young man or woman, which were developed around the middle of the seventh century BC in the Cyclades. Probably the earliest kore produced was the Dedication of Nikandre, which was dedicated to Artemis at her temple on Delos between 660 and 650 BC, while kouroi began to be created shortly after this. Kouroi and korai were used to represent both humans and divinities. Some kouroi, such as the Colossus of the Naxians from around 600 BC, are known to represent Apollo, while the Phrasikleia Kore was meant to represent a young woman whose tomb it originally marked.

Over the course of the sixth century, kouroi from Attica become more lifelike and naturalistic. However, this trend does not appear elsewhere in the Greek world. The genre began to become less common over the last part of the sixth century as the elites who commissioned kouroi declined in influence, and by around 480 kouroi were no longer made.

==== Pottery ====
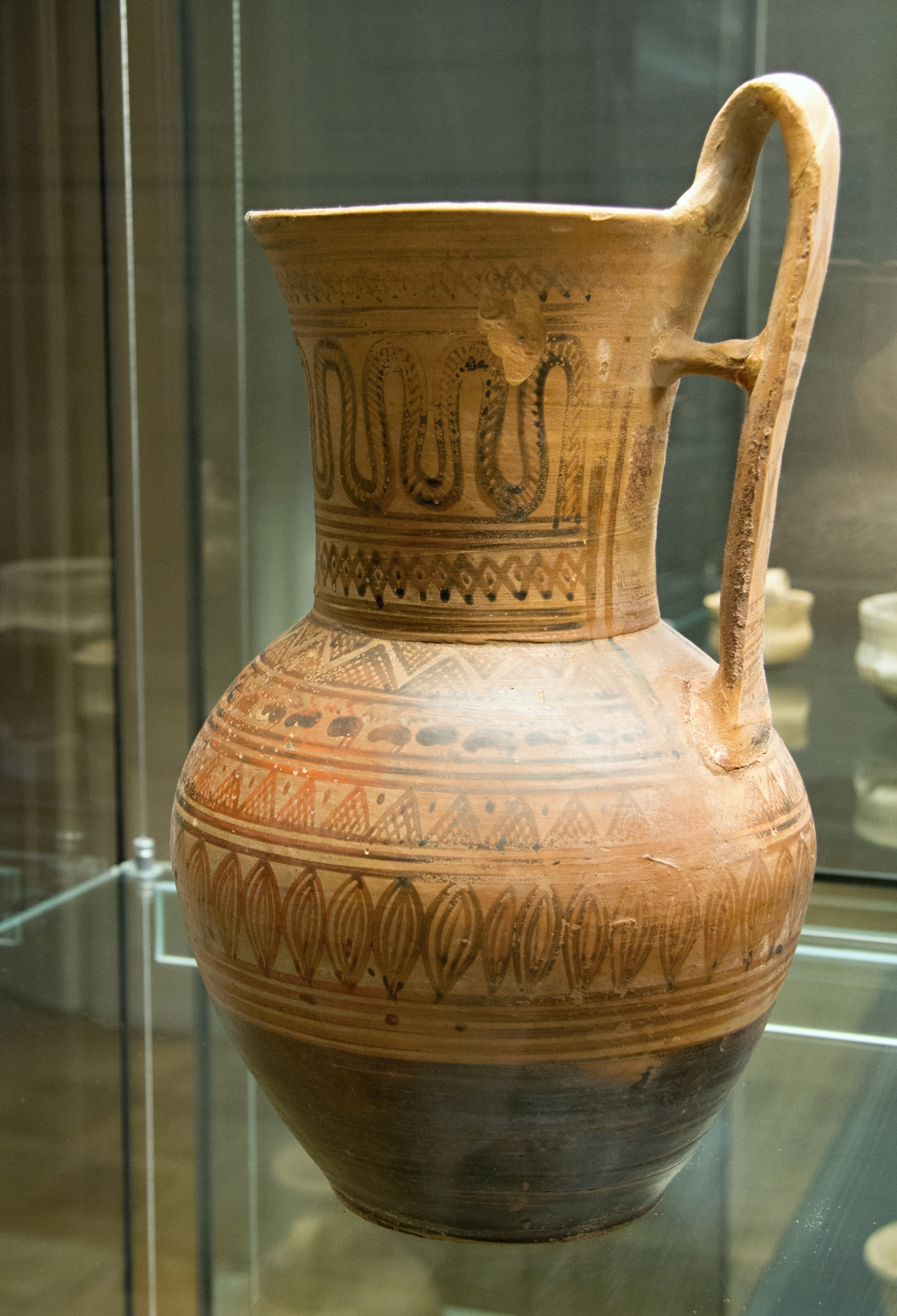
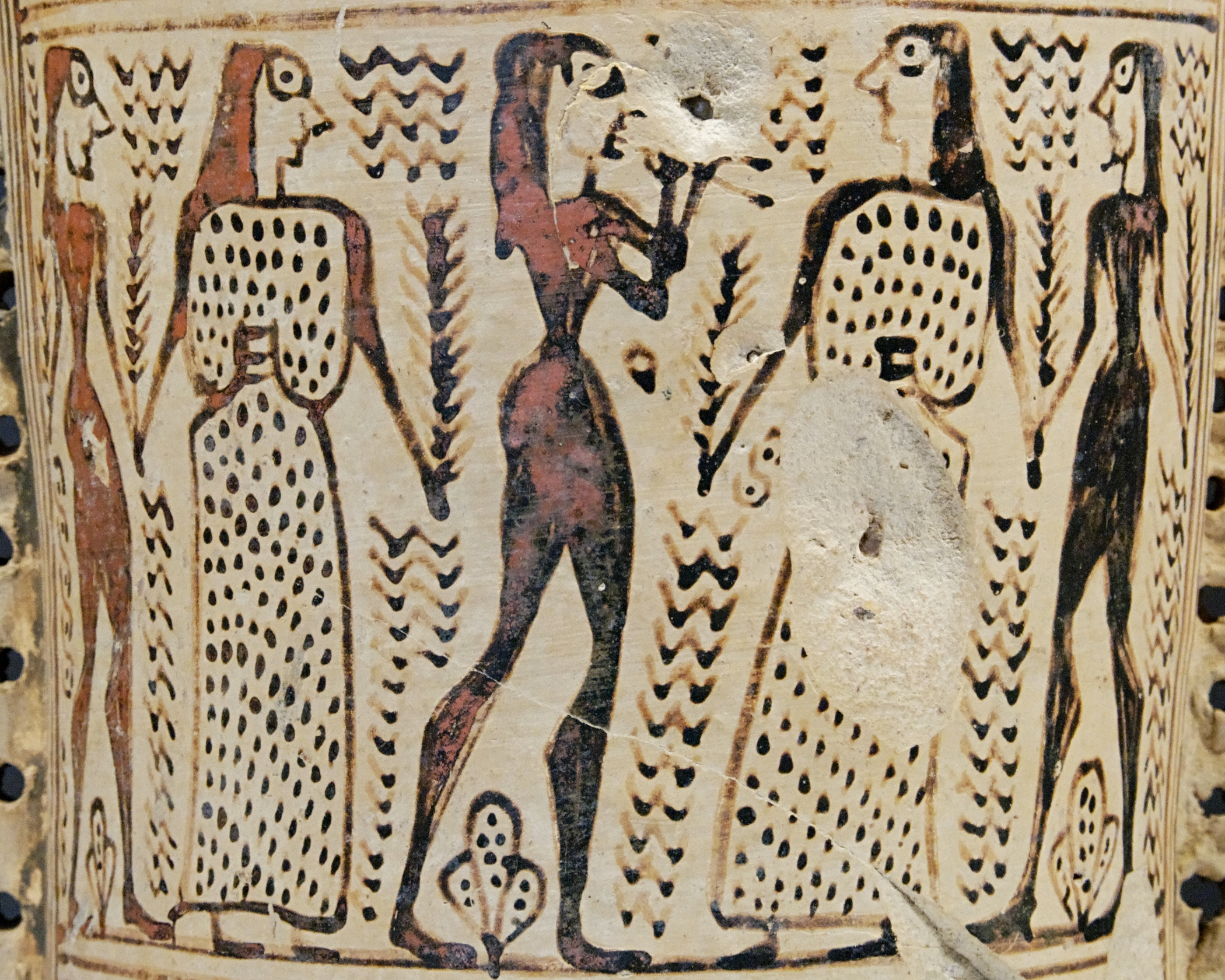
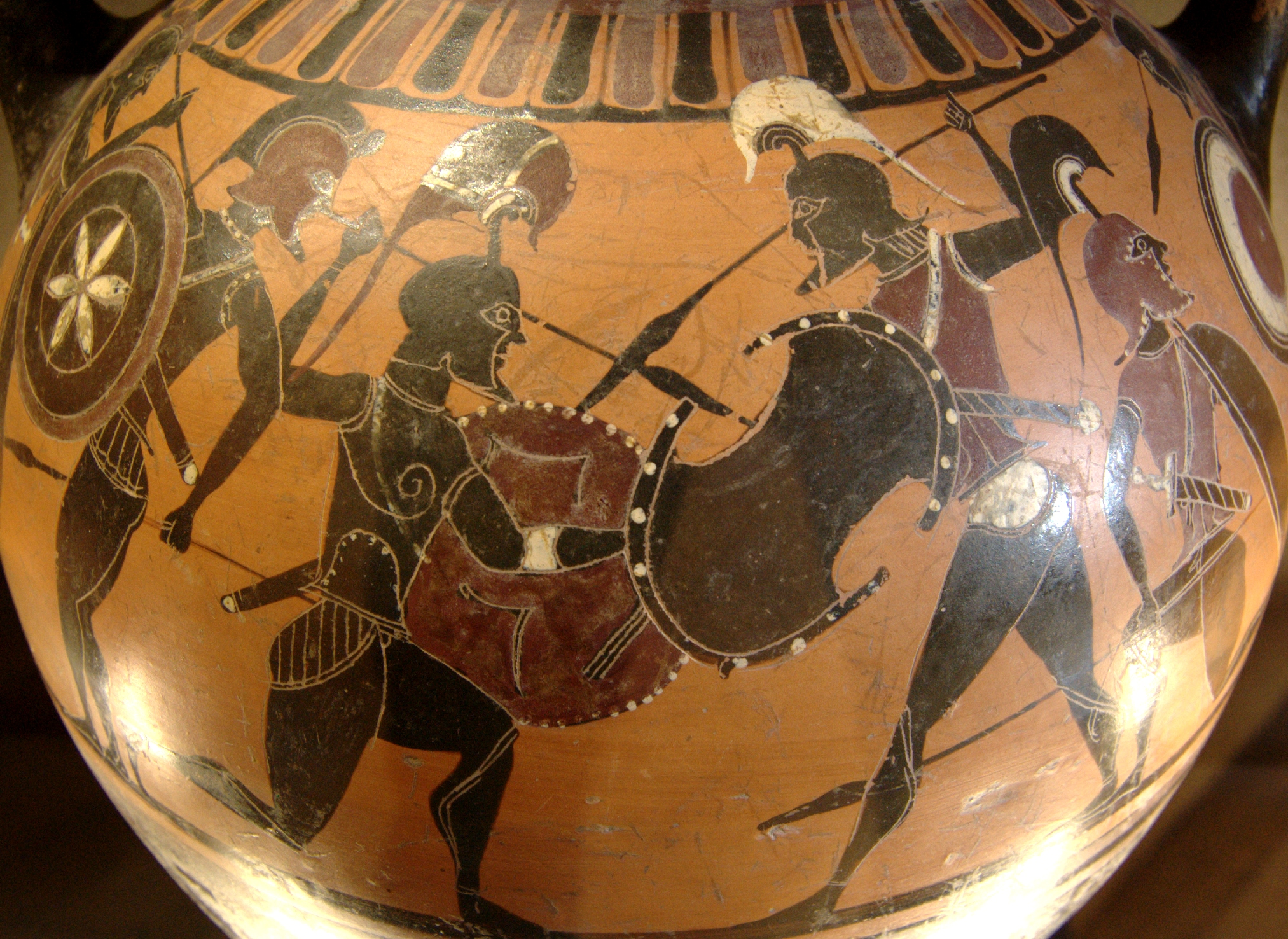
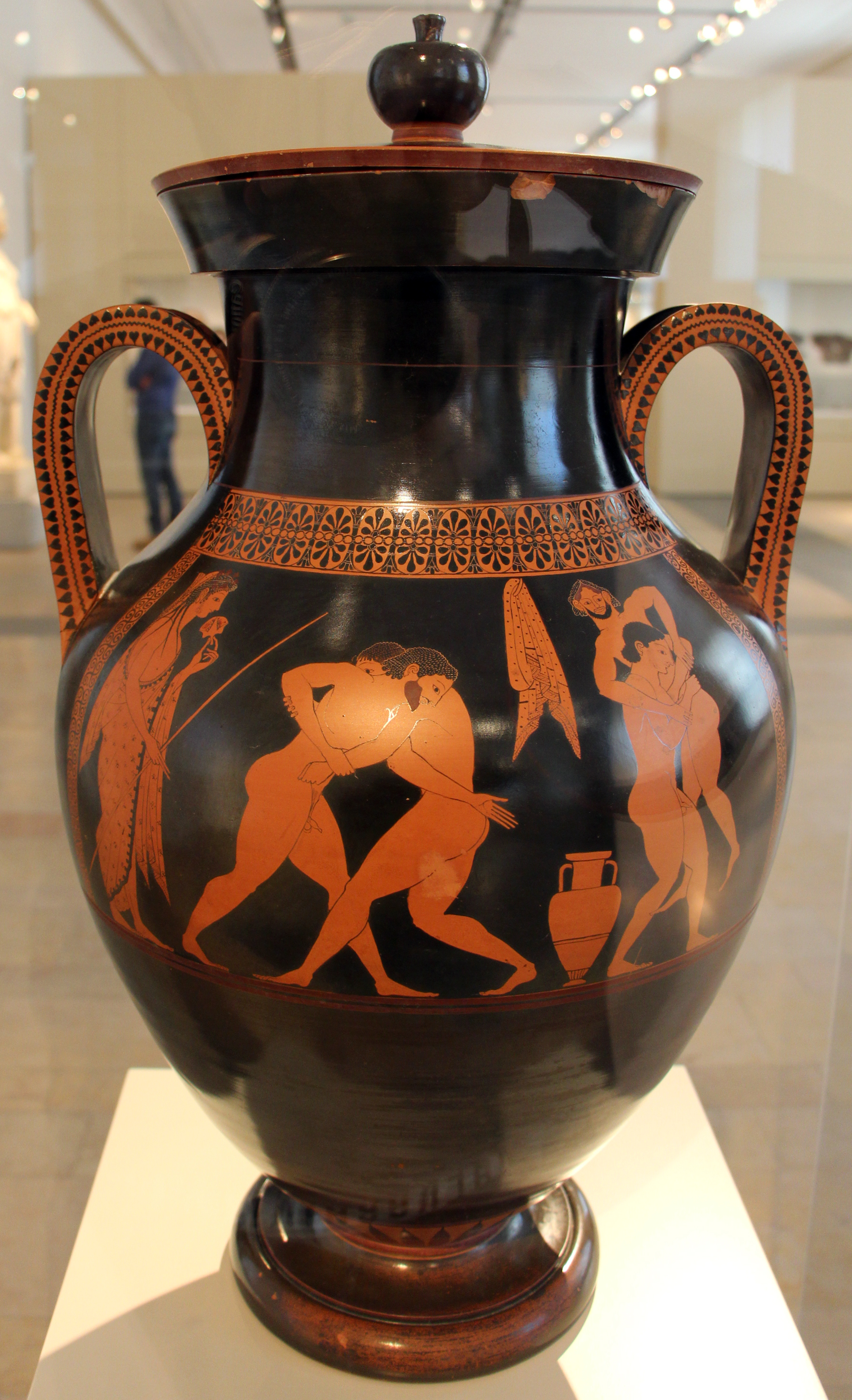
The archaic period saw a shift in styles of pottery decoration from the repeating patterns of the geometric period, through the eastern-influenced orientalizing style to the more representational black-figure and red-figure techniques.

The period saw a shift in the decoration of Greek pottery from abstract to figurative styles. During the Greek Dark Ages, following the fall of the Mycenaean civilization, Greek pottery decoration had been based around increasingly elaborate geometrical patterns. Human figures first appeared on Greek pots in Crete in the early part of the ninth century BC, but did not become common on mainland Greek pottery until the middle of the eighth century BC.

The eighth century saw the development of the orientalizing style, which signalled a shift away from the earlier geometric style and the accumulation of influences derived from Phoenicia and Syria. This orientalizing influence seems to have come from goods imported to Greece from the Near East.

At the beginning of the seventh century BC, vase painters in Corinth began to develop the black-figure style. At the same time, potters began to use incisions in the clay of vases in order to draw outlines and interior detailing. This adoption of incision, probably taken from eastern metalwork, allowed potters to show fine details of their decorations.

As the archaic period drew to a close, red-figure pottery was invented in Athens, with the first examples being produced about 525 BC, probably by the Andokides painter. The invention of the red-figure technique in Athens came at around the same time as the development of other techniques such as the white ground technique and Six's technique.

=== Literature ===
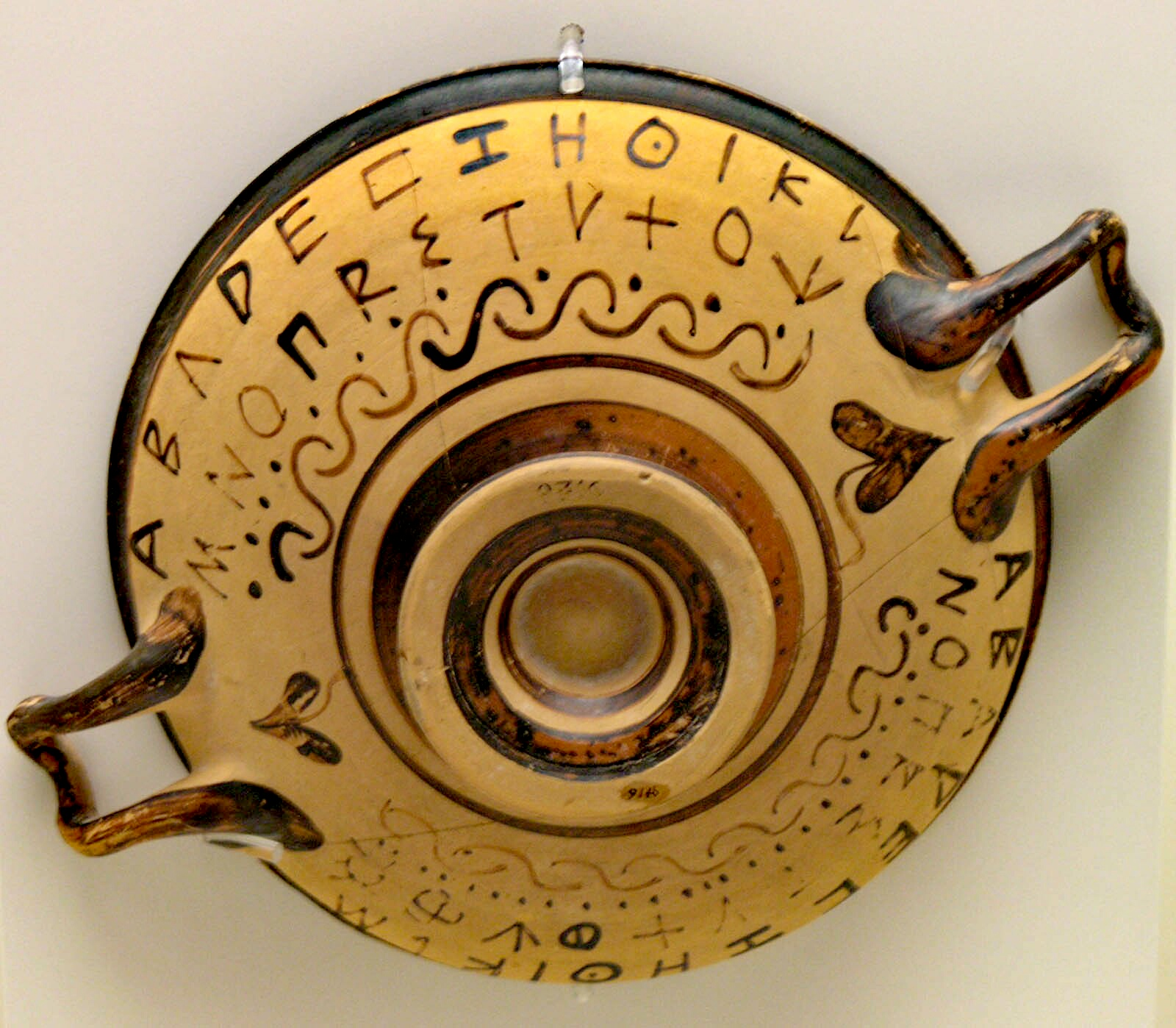
Attic black-figure vessel with double alphabet inscription, showing new letters ΥΧ[Φ]Ψ, and ΥΧΦΨΩ. Probably early 6th c. BC

The earliest extant Greek literature comes from the archaic period. Poetry was the predominant form of literature in the period. Alongside the dominant lyric and epic traditions, tragedy began to develop in the archaic period, borrowing elements from the pre-existing genres of archaic Greek poetry. By the sixth century BC the first written prose in Greek literature appeared.

==== Writing ====
After the end of the Mycenaean period, the art of writing was lost in Greece: by the ninth century probably no Greeks understood the Bronze Age Linear B writing system. From the ninth century BC objects inscribed with Phoenician writing began to be brought into the Greek world, and it was from this Phoenician script that the Greek alphabet developed in the eighth century BC. By the middle of the eighth century BC, pottery inscribed in Greek begins to occur in the archaeological record.

The earliest known inscriptions in Greek tend to identify or explain the object on which they are inscribed. Possibly the earliest known Greek inscription is found on a jug from the first half of the eighth century BC, discovered in Osteria dell'Osa in Latium. Most early inscriptions were written in verse, though some from Ionia were in prose, influenced by the prose traditions of Ionia's eastern neighbours. From the beginning of the seventh century, curses and dedications began to be inscribed on objects, and by the sixth century, surviving inscriptions include public records such as law codes, lists of officials, and records of treaties.

==== Poetry ====
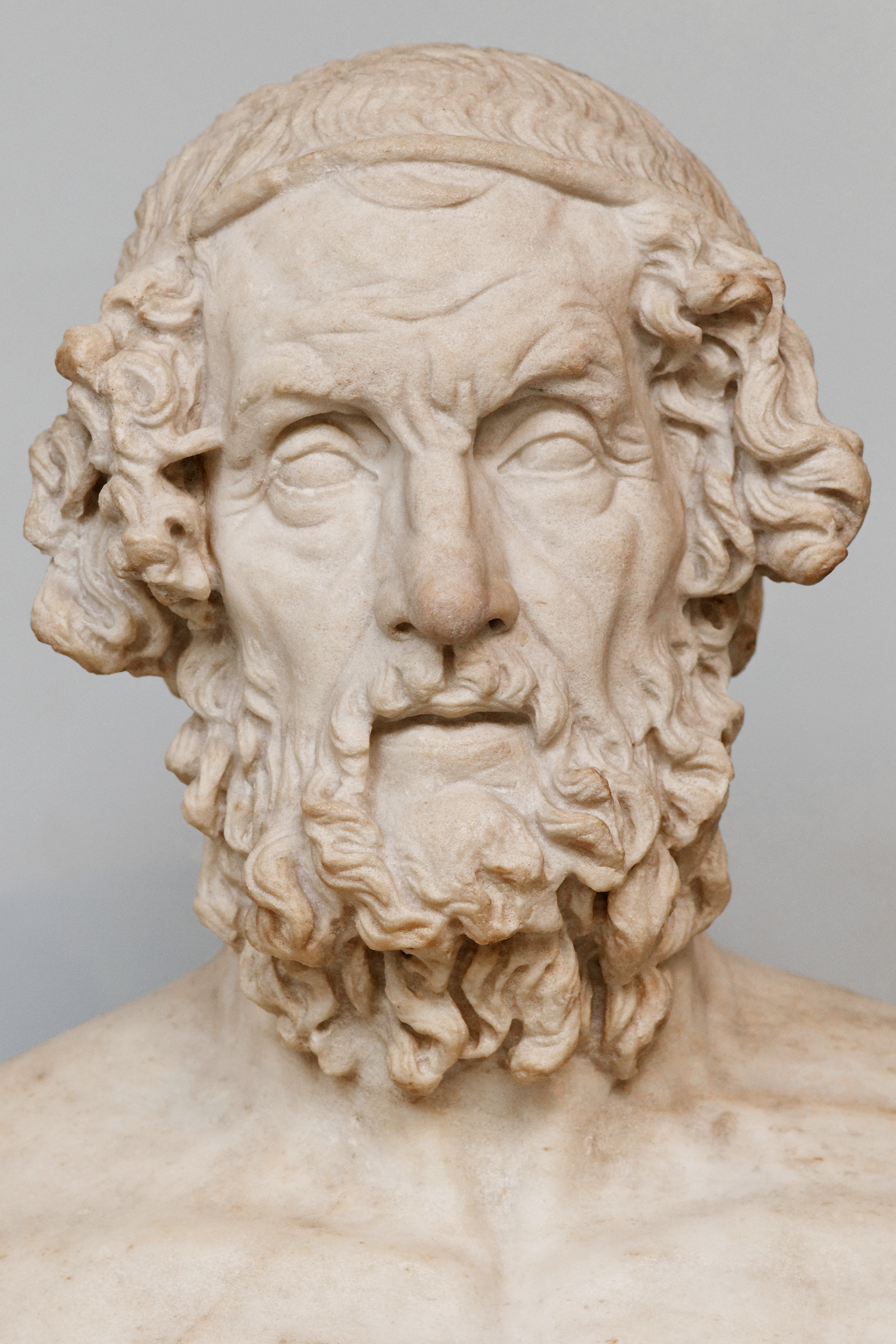
Homer, author of the earliest surviving Greek literature

Greek literature in the archaic period was predominantly poetry, though the earliest prose dates to the sixth century BC. Archaic poetry was primarily intended to be performed rather than read, and can be broadly divided into three categories: lyric, rhapsodic, and citharodic. The performance of the poetry could either be private (most commonly in the symposium) or public.

Though there would certainly have been a pre-existing literary tradition in Greece, the earliest surviving works are by Homer. Homer's poetry, though it dates to around the time that the Greeks developed writing, would have been composed orally – the earliest surviving poetry to have certainly been composed in writing is that of Archilochus, from the mid-seventh century BC. In contrast with the Classical period, in which the literary culture of Athens dominated the Greek world, the archaic poetic tradition was geographically spread out. Sappho and Alcaeus, for instance, were from Lesbos, while Pindar came from Thebes, and Alcman from Sparta.

The beginnings of Greek tragedy also have their roots in the archaic period, though the exact history is obscure. The competition in tragedy at the Great Dionysia began in the 530s BC. Aristotle believed that early tragedy developed from the dithyramb, a choral hymn to Dionysius; by ancient tradition the development from dithyramb to tragedy was ascribed to Thespis.

=== Religion ===
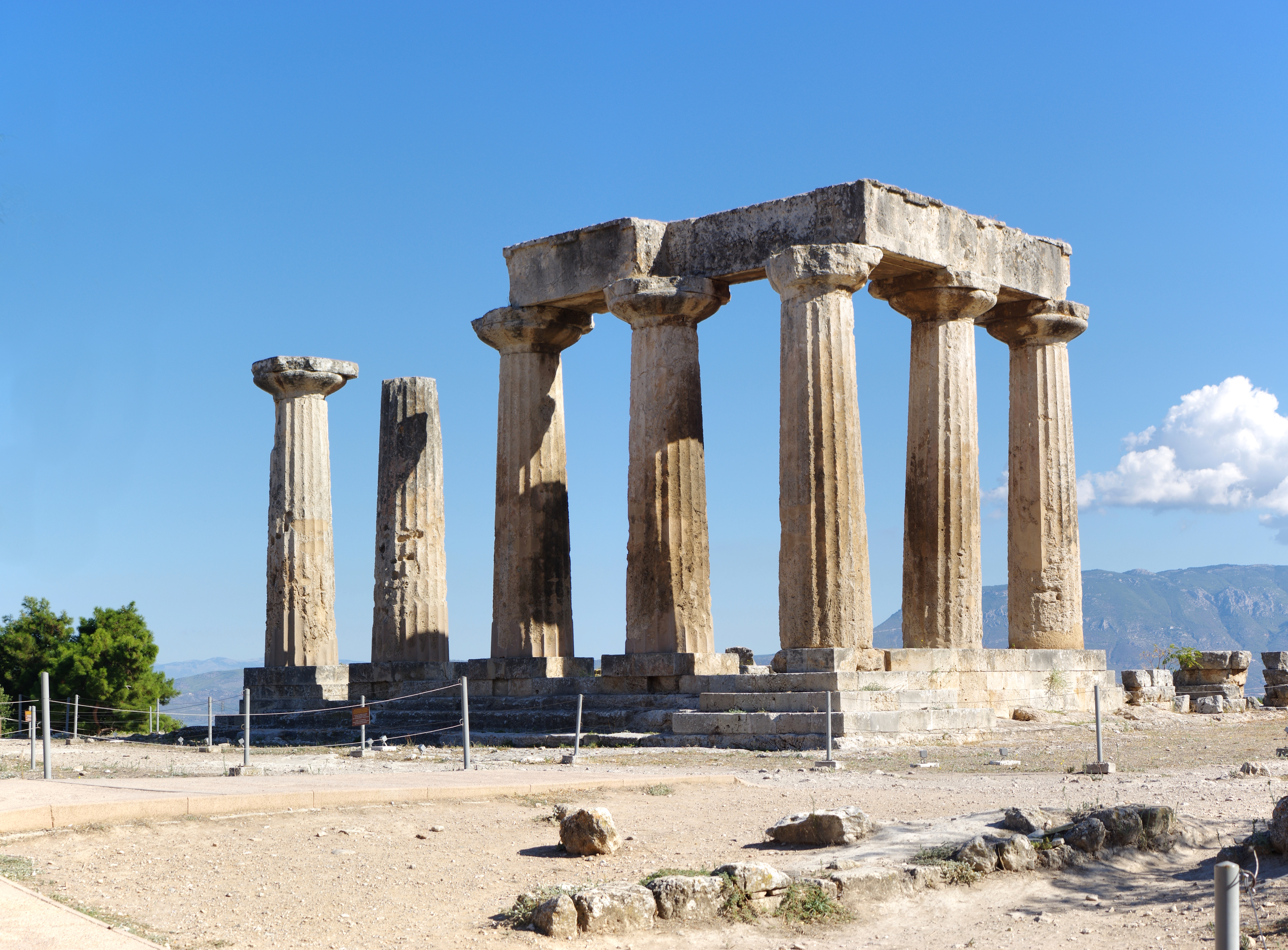
The remains of the Temple of Apollo in Corinth, the first Greek temple to be built in stone.

Evidence from Linear B tablets shows that the gods worshipped in archaic and classical Greece shared names with those worshipped by their Mycenaean predecessors. However, the practice of religion changed significantly in the archaic period.

The most significant change of the eighth century was the development of permanent temples as a regular feature of sanctuary sites, where in the Dark Ages there had probably been no building specifically used for cult purposes. In the seventh century, this development of temples continued with the appearance of the first monumental stone temple buildings, beginning with the temple of Apollo at Corinth. These temples were probably built to house cult statues of the god. Except on Crete, where there may have been a continuous tradition of cult statues from the Mycenaean period, these cult images were a new development in Greek religion – there is no evidence that Greek Dark Age cult on the mainland used cult images.

Along with the introduction of temples came an increase in the number of dedications at cult sites. In the seventh century, the number of surviving dedications decreases again, but there is also a marked change in the character of dedications, from the figurines of animals common in the eighth century to human figurines. In the eighth century, some sanctuaries – for instance at Olympia – begin to attract dedications from outside the local area.

==== Olympia ====
The sanctuary of Zeus at Olympia had been a cult site in the Dark Ages, with dedications there dating back to the tenth century BC, but the eighth century saw an explosion in the number of dedications: 160 animal figurines are known from the 9th century, compared to 1,461 from the 8th. Bronze tripods and jewellery have also been discovered as dedications at archaic Olympia. Though most of the dedications from the 8th century were manufactured in the Peloponnese, dedications also came from Attica, and even as far afield as Italy and the eastern Mediterranean.

This enormous explosion in cultic activity in Olympia apparently coincides with the establishment of the Olympic Games as a major event. According to Greek tradition the first games at Olympia had been established by Heracles, but these had fallen out of practice until they were revived in 776 BC.

==== Delphi ====
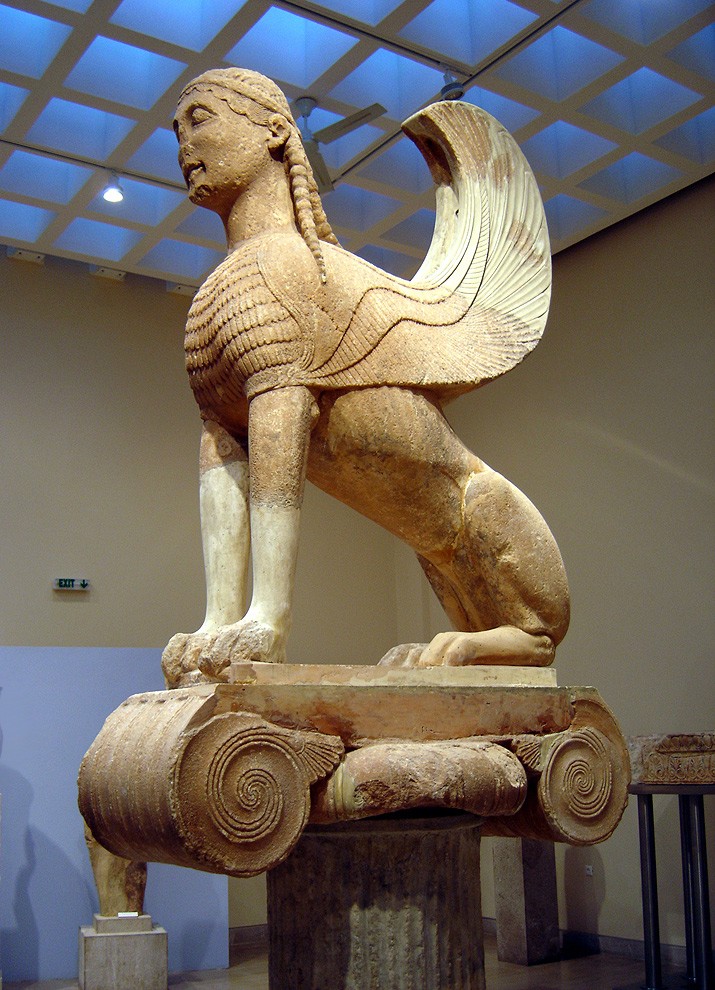
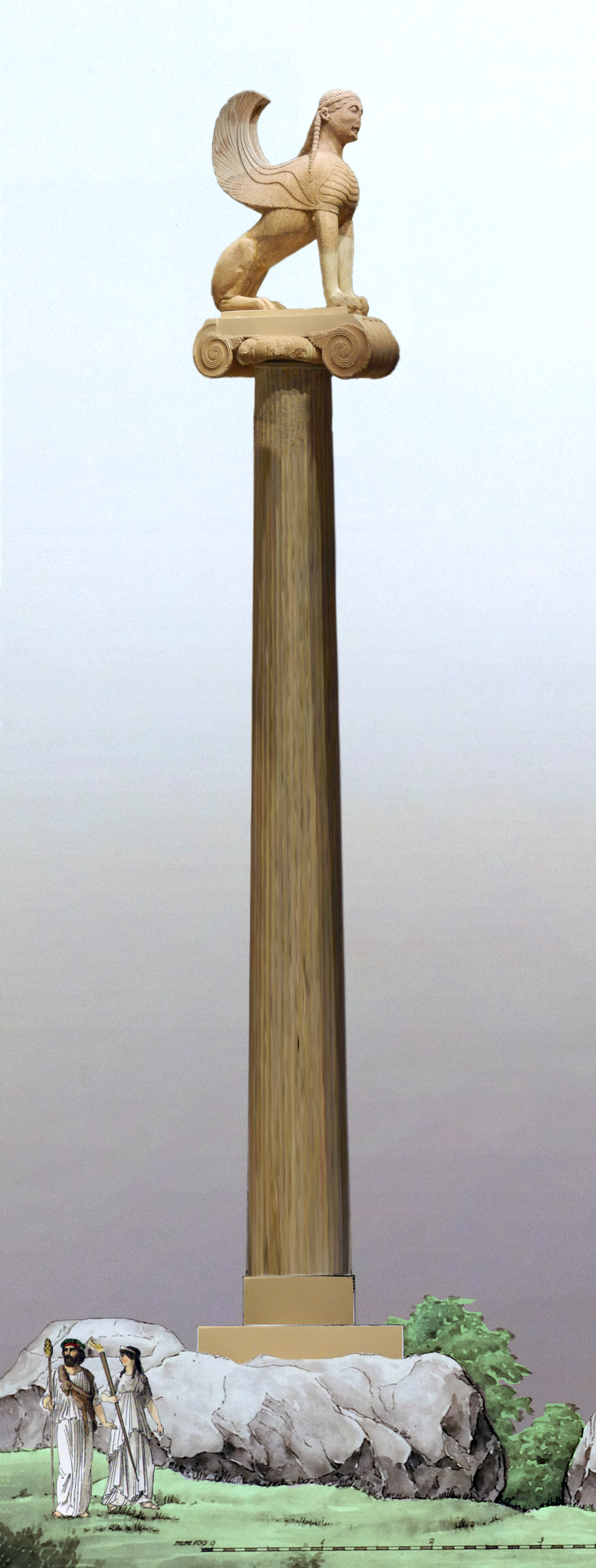
The Sphinx of Naxos, built in 560 BC in Delphi, the religious centre of Ancient Greece. The drawing (right) shows the sphinx as it would have been seen on its original 12.5 metre column.

Delphi, on the slopes of Mount Parnassus, had been continuously occupied from the Bronze Age, but the first evidence of a sanctuary there dates to the eighth century BC when dedicatory bronze tripods and votive figurines begin to appear in the archaeological record. In the last quarter of the eighth century, the number of offerings at Delphi significantly increased, and there is evidence that these offerings were beginning to come from across Greece. This pan-Hellenic interest in the sanctuary at Delphi was presumably driven by the development of the oracle there.

==== Funerary practices ====
The archaic period saw a series of changes in Greek funerary practices, with a significant increase in the diversity of Greek burial practice.

In Athens, the Dark Age practice had been to cremate adults and then bury the remains in a pottery vessel, along with pottery and metal grave goods. Soon after 800 BC, burial superseded cremation as the primary way of disposing of adult bodies, and grave goods declined in both quantity and quality; at the same time, the pots used as grave markers became significantly more elaborate. By the last third of the century, children and adults began to be buried together (previously there had been separate cemeteries for adults and children). Grave goods began to be left in trenches specifically for offerings which were separate from the graves themselves. Around 700 BC, Athens changed from inhumation back to cremation – but this time, cremation in the grave rather than on a separate pyre.

Also around 700 BC, burial in Athens was almost entirely confined to specific cemeteries outside of the settlement. Other settlements outside of Athens also saw a move to burial only in areas reserved for the purpose, though this was not a new development in Crete and several Aegean islands. Some other mainland cities, such as Argos and Corinth, also saw a reduction in grave goods. In Athens in the sixth century, Solon passed laws restricting the extravagance of funerals, and similar restrictions were also implemented at Gortyn, Mytilene, and Sparta.

=== Philosophy ===
The archaic period saw the beginning of philosophical and scientific thinking in Greece, and the Greeks' interaction with other cultures from Italy, Egypt, and the Near East in this period had a significant impact on their thought. In the archaic period, the boundaries between disciplines had not yet developed, and so the thinkers who were later identified as philosophers also engaged in practical pursuits: Andrea Nightingale describes them as "pragmatic and polymathic". For instance, ancient traditions about Thales of Miletus, traditionally identified as the first philosopher, also show his skill in such diverse fields as astronomy, engineering, politics, agriculture, and commerce.

== Military developments ==
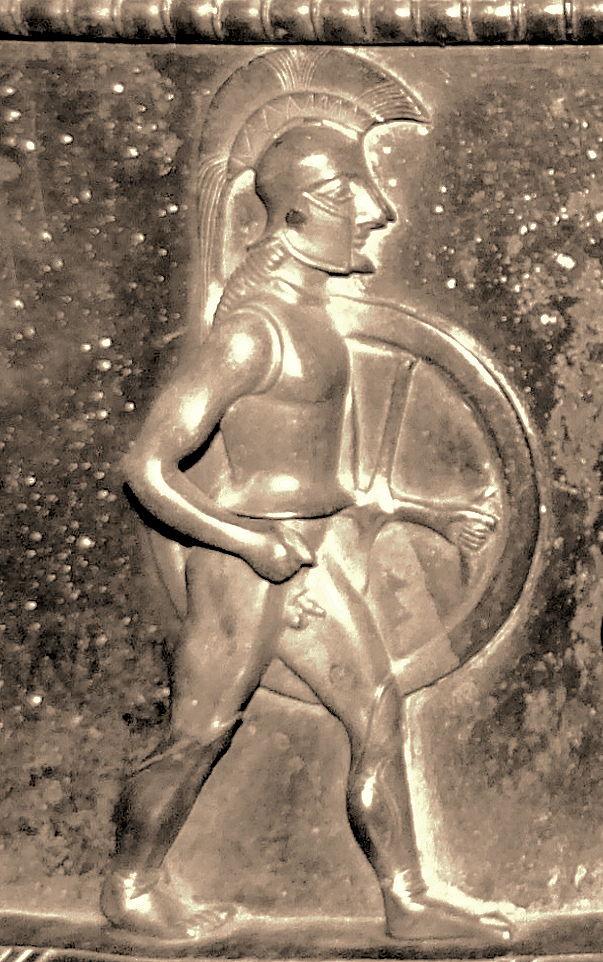
A hoplite (probably Spartan), on the Vix Crater, c. 500 BC

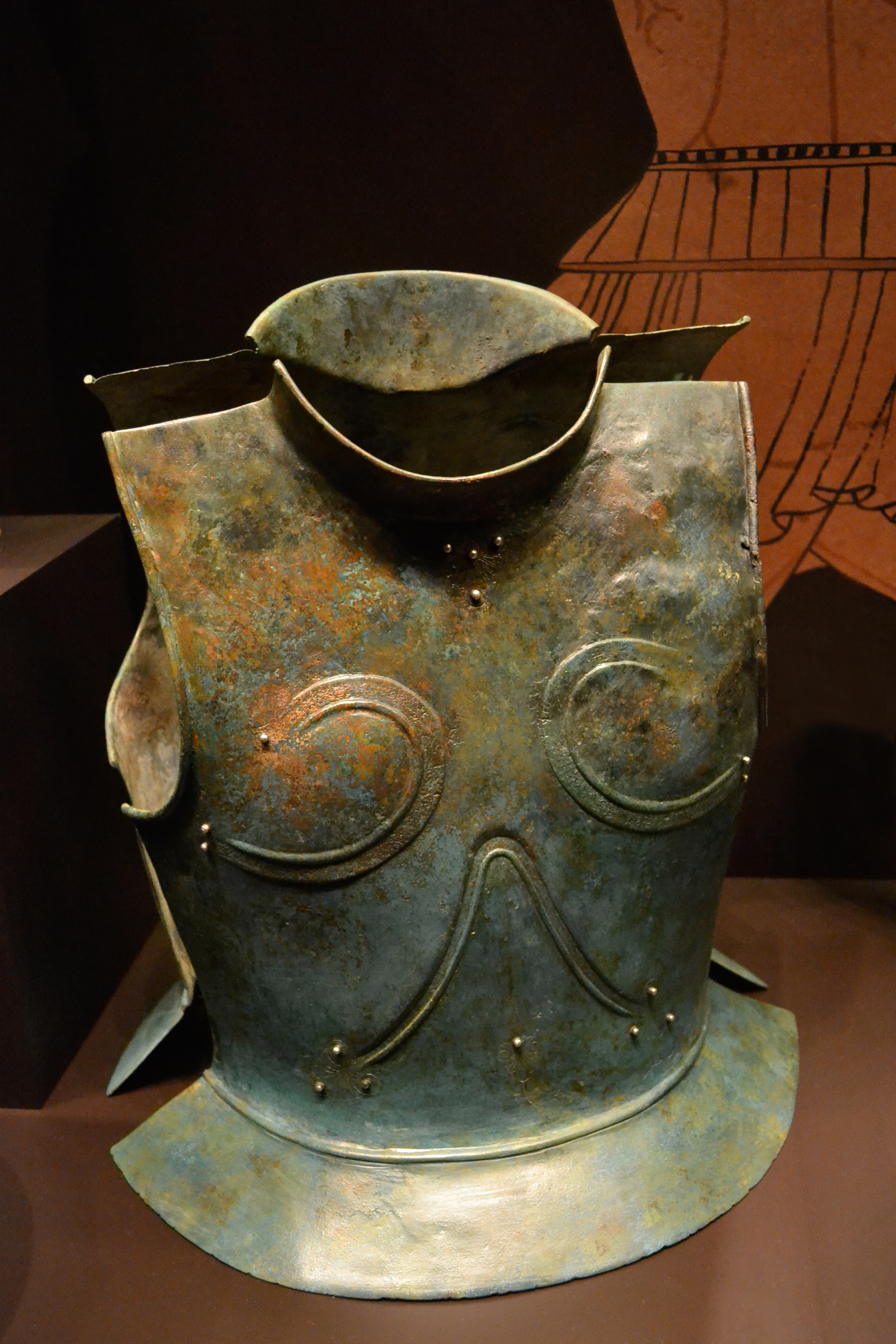
An archaic Greek cuirass, dated to the late 7th century BC

In the archaic period, the most significant military development was the adoption of hoplite warfare by the Greek states. This occurred in the early part of the seventh century BC. The panoply, or hoplite's armour, began to appear in the eighth century; the earliest known example comes from Argos in the late eighth century.

Though the pieces which made up the panoply were all in use in Greece by the end of the eighth century, the earliest evidence for it being worn as a complete set of armour does not come until around 675 BC, where it is depicted on a Corinthian vase painting. The phalanx tactics which were used by hoplites in the Classical period seem to have been adopted in the mid-seventh century; before this point, the older style of combat in which spears were thrown at the enemy before closing quarters was still used.

In the naval sphere, the archaic period saw the development of the trireme in Greece. In the eighth century, Greek navies began to use bireme ships with two banks of oars, and the three banked trireme seems to have become popular in the seventh century. Corinth was probably the first place in the Greek world to adopt the trireme in the mid seventh century BC. It was not until the mid-sixth century that the trireme became the most popular design for Greek warships, due to its expense. According to Thucydides, the period saw the first Greek naval battles; he dates the first to around 664 BC.

== See also ==
- Ancient history
- Classical antiquity
