= Rapture Encaged =

1994 book by Ruth El Saffar

Rapture Encaged: The Suppression of the Feminine in Western Culture
- Author: Ruth El Saffar (introduction dictated to Diana de Armas Wilson)
- Language: English
- Subject: Isabel de la Cruz
- Genre: History
- Published: 1994
- Publisher: Routledge
- Pages: 168
- ISBN: 0415110831
- OCLC: 29564426

Rapture Encaged: The Suppression of the Feminine in Western Culture is a 1994 book by Ruth El Saffar, published by Routledge. Published shortly after El Saffar's death, it analyses the life of Isabel de la Cruz through Jungian theory, which it also criticizes for its perceivedly outdated nature.

== Contents ==
Written in five chapters, Rapture Encaged centers on Isabel de la Cruz, a Spanish mystic El Saffar considers "one of the last exponents of the medieval age of mysticism". Providing a rhetorical question on "whether there exists an authentic female vision that patriarchal cultures, from the Greeks to the present day, have systematically sought to deny and expunge", El Saffar confronts two pairs of subject matter between each other: Cruz's mystical nature against Jungian theory, and femininity against masculinity.

El Saffar criticizes Freudian and Jungian psychoanalytics as "incapable, for cultural and historical reasons, of imagining a fully realized female Self", and she criticizes the anima and animus for its androcentric and excessively argumentative nature and Jungian individuation for not providing a presumption for "a well-established ego". She subsequently uses the concept of Jungian archetypes to approach the visions of mystics like de la Cruz. In the third chapter, El Saffar examines the relationship between the collective unconsciousness and contemporary, with 16th-century Spain effectively depicted as an Oedipal crisis, while also drawing comparisons with the perceivedly-gendered patterns of the Spanish Empire and medieval women's Christian mysticism.

El Saffar uses her experiences as a Jungian analyst to approach the book's material through the lens of "a critical reading of psychoanalytic theory, the European Renaissance, and ultimately Western civilization", recalling Isabel's life before the convent through the lens of "a mature mother [instead] an objective reporter" and depicting it as a case history similar to Jung's. Using Jungian theory on the anima and animus, El Saffar posits that the transformed animus showed Isabel and her fellow mystic Teresa of Ávila a vulnerable Jesus which, in her words, "represents the shadow of the masculine animus and is able, because of his lowliness, to attract the trust of the ravaged ego of the self-deprecating female religious". El Saffar then cites Isabel's experience and subsequent friendship with a literate nun who helped with Isabel's issues with illiteracy as an example of good object relations, and argues that the titular "rapture" ceased to be in the titular "encaged" state when Isabel's Self emerged with her animus losing its masculine qualities.

== Background and reception ==
Rapture Encaged was published in 1994 by Routledge, shortly after El Saffar's death. Due to being hospitalized during the last year of her life, she had to dictate the book's introduction to a close friend of hers, fellow Cervantes scholar Diana de Armas Wilson. The two had previously co-edited the 1993 volume Quixotic Desire.

Gregory S. Hutcheson said of the book: "A caveat to those looking for a quick fix: Rapture Encaged is not addressed specifically to the Hispanist, nor is it an easy read for the unindoctrinated. Nonetheless, it stands to have a lasting impact on the way we construe the history and literature of the Spanish Golden Age." Marianne Jacoby praised the book as a "a valuable and resourceful work which should be read by every Jungian feminist," citing "the intellectual rigour and the discipline of the condensed style", and as "of great value to Jungian readers" due to the author's equal experience in analytical psychology and the humanities. However, she criticized the writing style; its over-selective sourcing for Jung's female individuation, and its lack of coverage of de la Cruz's father compared to her other relatives and close associations.
