= Ruth El Saffar =

American literary scholar (1941–1994)

- Born: June 12, 1941; New York City, U.S.
- Died: March 28, 1994 (aged 52); Zion, Illinois, U.S.
- Occupation: Literary scholar
- Spouse: Zuhair El Saffar (m. 1966)
- Children: 3 (including Amir ElSaffar)
- Awards: Guggenheim Fellowship (1975)

Academic background
- Education: Colorado College; Johns Hopkins University
- Thesis: Distance and control in Don Quixote: a study of narrative technique (1966)
- Doctoral advisor: Elias Rivers

Academic work
- Sub-discipline: Miguel de Cervantes
- Institutions: University of Baghdad; University of Maryland, Baltimore; University of Illinois Chicago

Ruth Anthony Snodgrass El Saffar (June 12, 1941 – March 28, 1994) was an American literary scholar who specialized in the work of the Spanish writer Miguel de Cervantes. A 1975 Guggenheim Fellow, her work included Beyond Fiction (1984), Critical Essays on Cervantes (1986), and Rapture Encaged (1994), and she served as president of the Cervantes Society of America until her death in 1993.

== Biography ==
El Saffar was born on June 12, 1941, in New York City, to Ruth née Wheelwright and John Tabb Snodgrass. She attended Colorado College, where she obtained her BA in philosophy in 1962, and Johns Hopkins University, where she obtained her PhD in 1966, as a Woodrow Wilson Fellow. Her dissertation Distance and control in Don Quixote: a study of narrative technique was supervised by Elias Rivers.

After working at the University of Baghdad as an English instructor in 1967, she spent that year at University of Maryland, Baltimore as an assistant professor of Spanish, before moving to University of Illinois Chicago the next year. She was promoted from assistant professor to associate professor in 1973.

El Saffar was an expert on the Spanish writer Miguel de Cervantes. Her work included five books, the first four of which were on Cervantes – Cervantes: Novel to Romance (1974), Distance and Control in Don Quixote (1975), Cervantes' El casamiento engañoso y el coloquio de los perros (1976), Beyond Fiction (1984) – as well as edited volumes such as Critical Essays on Cervantes (1986), Studies in Honor of Elias Rivers (1989), and Quixotic Desire (1993). She became president of the Cervantes Society of America in 1993, serving until her death; John Jay Allen called El Saffar "among the most pervasive influences" on the organization. She also served as an executive council member for the Modern Language Association from 1974 to 1978, as well as the CSA.

In 1975, she was awarded a Guggenheim Fellowship "for textual and comparative studies of Spanish fiction of the Golden Age". In 1987, she obtained her honorary degree from Colorado College. Her festschrift Voces A Ti Debidas (edited by Marie Cort Daniels, Herving Madruga, and Susan Wilcox) was published in 1993 as part of the Colorado College Studies series.

On April 11, 1966, she married Zuhair El Saffar, a physics professor who emigrated from Iraq. She had three children, raising them in what Rivers recalled "a Baltimore row house near the campus"; one of them was jazz musician Amir ElSaffar. She also worked as a practicing Jungian analyst outside academia.

She died of cancer in 1994. Her final book about Isabel de la Cruz, Rapture Encaged, was published by Routledge that year, shortly after her death. She had been hospitalized during the last year of her life, so she dictated the book's introduction to a close friend of hers, fellow Cervantes scholar Diana de Armas Wilson.

== Bibliography ==
- Beyond Fiction (1984) (Note: Reviews of this book:)
- Critical Essays on Cervantes (1986) (Note: Reviews of this book:)
- Quixotic Desire (1993; co-edited with Diana de Armas Wilson)
- Rapture Encaged (1994)
