= María de Santo Domingo =

Spanish Christian mystic, c.1485–c.1524

Sister María de Santo Domingo, "La Beata de Piedrahita" ("the "holy woman of Piedrahíta") was a Spanish mystic (c. 1485 – c. 1524) of the early 16th century.

== Life ==
María was born in the village of Aldeanueva de Santa Cruz. According to her contemporaries, this peasant visionary, who was the daughter of devout farmers, spent her childhood doing charitable works and spending long hours in prayer.

Piedrahíta, near Ávila, where the Inquisitor General Torquemada had gone to live in the Dominican monastery, was María's spiritual home. As a young woman, she became a tertiary sister in the same Dominican order in Piedrahita that had fostered the young Torquemada. Taking the name María de Santo Domingo, Maria was what in Spain at that time was termed a beata, that is to say, an unmarried woman who was not a nun, but who quested after holiness by taking vows of chastity and often of poverty. Soon she transferred to Ávila.

María's charismatic personality expressed itself in numerous revelations, in which she held celestial converse with the Virgin Mary and the Savior. She informed her contemporaries that Christ was with her, that she was Christ, and that she was Christ's bride, a concept that offers parallels with her neighbor in Ávila, Saint Teresa of Ávila. Maria often spent hours in ecstatic trances—unmoving, her arms and legs rigidly extended, dissolving herself in the arms of the Deity. Though unlearned she was reputed to be the equal of the most sophisticated theologians, revelations compensating for her lack of schooling. Ávila's Dominican Provincial, Diego Magdaleno, sent Maria to Toledo to inspect the Order's houses there and initiate ascetic reforms. That administrative order was still shockingly improper to Dominican historian Beltrán in 1939.

The widowed Ferdinand II of Aragon summoned Maria to his court at Burgos. During the season of 1507–08, she impressed the king and his courtiers, including Cardinal Cisneros. However, other contemporaries were confounded and scandalised, denouncing Maria as a self-seeking fraud and labeled her ecstatic behavior "lascivious". The Dominicans' new Master General, Thomas Cajetan, suspected the devil rather than God inspired Maria. He restricted her access to the friars of Santo Domingo, who were agitating for ascetic reforms. The Duke of Alba, one of whose palaces faced the monastery at Ávila, took a patron's interest in the four trials concerning Maria's orthodoxy between 1508 and 1510.

The Duke of Alba, his cousin King Ferdinand and Cardinal Cisneros (who became regent of Castile), convinced the episcopal hierarchy that La Beata enjoyed a special inspiration available to very few. Their support proved crucial with respect to the heresy charges. Not only was Maria absolved of the charges, the inquisitors pronounced her life and doctrine exemplary. La Beata became prioress in a convent founded especially for her by the Duke of Alba in her native village in central Castile.

Antonio de la Peña and Diego Victoria transcribed Maria's stream-of-consciousness Book of Prayer, and printed it circa 1518. A copy was discovered in Zaragoza and a facsimile edition republished in Madrid (1948). An English translation appeared in 1992.

The name of alumbrados ("illuminati"), says the orthodox Catholic Encyclopedia (1907–1914), was assumed by some 16th-century Spanish "false mystics" who claimed — like La Beata de Piedrahíta — to have a direct connection with God. "They held that the human soul can reach such a degree of perfection that it contemplates even in the present life the essence of God and comprehends the mystery of the Trinity. All external worship, they declared, is superfluous, the reception of the sacraments useless, and sin impossible in this state of complete union with Him Who is Perfection Itself. Carnal desires may be indulged and other sinful actions committed freely without staining the soul." The Catholic Encyclopedia specifically states that although La Beata de Piedrahíta "is cited among the early adherents of these errors...it is not certain that she was guilty of heresy". Furthermore, many recent scholars, like Álvaro Huerga, question, on chronological and other grounds, the tendency to consider La Beata de Piedrahíta one of the alumbrados, placing her rather among the "pre-alumbrados"

La Beata was not alone. At Toledo, Isabel de la Cruz actively proselytized, and Magdalena de la Cruz, a Poor Clare of Aguilar, near Córdoba, was even more famous. The Inquisition, however, convinced the latter to abjure her heretical errors in 1546. Their ideas found wide responses among Spanish Catholics, though the Inquisition proceeded with relentless energy against all suspects, citing before its tribunal even St. John of Avila and St. Ignatius of Loyola.
