= Alumbrados =

Persecuted Christian sect in medieval Spain

The alumbrados (Spanish pronunciation: [alumˈbɾaðos], "illuminated"), also known by the Latin designation Illuminati, were practitioners of mystical forms of Christianity and participants in religious reform movements in Spain, particularly the Crown of Castile, during the 15th to 17th centuries. Their movements emphasized personal holiness and spiritual enlightenment, and at least three distinct groups have been identified, attracting adherents from both educated and uneducated backgrounds.

The beliefs associated with the alumbrados varied considerably: some adherents were only mildly heterodox, while others held positions regarded as clearly heretical by contemporary authorities. They were consequently subjected to severe repression and became among the early targets of the Spanish Inquisition. Their supposed connection with Lutheranism contributed to particularly fierce persecution. At the same time, prominent Catholic figures including Ignatius of Loyola, John of the Cross, and Teresa of Ávila were themselves accused of illuminism, illustrating the proximity between some of the alumbrados' aspirations toward holiness and those found among otherwise diverse currents of contemporary Christian spirituality.

== Background ==
Marcelino Menéndez y Pelayo found the name as early as 1492 (in the form aluminados, 1498), and traced the group to a Gnostic origin. He thought their views were promoted in Spain through influences from Italy.

== Beliefs ==
The alumbrados held that the human soul can reach such a degree of perfection that it can even in the present life contemplate the essence of God and comprehend the mystery of the Trinity. All external worship, they declared, is superfluous, the reception of the sacraments useless, and sin impossible in this state of complete union with God. Persons in this state of impeccability could indulge their sexual desires and commit other sinful acts freely without staining their souls.

In 1525, the Grand Office of the Holy Inquisition issued an Edict on the alumbrados in which the Inquisitor General, Alonso Manrique de Lara, explained how the new heresy of alumbradismo was discovered and investigated. The text then gave a numbered list of forty-eight heretical propositions which had emerged from the trials of the alumbrados' first leaders, Isabel de la Cruz and Pedro Ruiz de Alcaraz. After each proposition were given the grounds on which it was judged heretical. Among the odder of these propositions are that it is a mortal sin to read a book to console one's soul (No. 31), which the Inquisition's theologians described as "crazy, erroneous, and even heretical"; and that one sinned mortally every time one loved a son, daughter, or other person, and did not love that person through God (No. 36), which the theologians said was "erroneous and false, and against the common teaching of the saints". One alumbrado, seeing a girl cross the street, said that "she had sinned, because in that action she had fulfilled her will" (No. 40). The theologians commented: "The foundation of this proposition is heretical, because it seems to state that all action that proceeds from our will is sin."

== Historical cases ==
A labourer's daughter known as La Beata de Piedrahita, born in Salamanca, came to the notice of the Inquisition in 1511, by claiming to hold colloquies with Jesus and the Virgin Mary; some high patronage saved her from a rigorous denunciation. She is often, as The Catholic Encyclopedia cautiously notes, "cited as an early adherent" of the alumbrados' errors, though "it is not certain that she was guilty of heresy". Some scholars—like the Dominican historian and theologian Álvaro Huerga—take a relatively favorable view of her. They question on chronological and other grounds the tendency to associate her with the movement, seeing her rather as "pre-alumbrados".

https://www.press.jhu.edu/books/title/3059/women-inquisition?srsltid=AfmBOopOFXYLT63ImrtikFudU18iSXh8sfzJzWXDHjkiSOv8xsiZF10IBeatriz de Robles lived in an Andalusian village, and while frequenting her village’s church, she told others about her visions of Jesus. She claimed she was “very beloved and favored” by him. She was identified as an alumbrados by inquisitors who felt she was spreading illumist heresy.

Henry Charles Lea, in his A History of the Inquisition in Spain, mentions, among the more extravagant alumbrados, a priest from Seville named Fernando Méndez, who had acquired a special reputation for sanctity: "he taught his disciples to invoke his intercession, as though he were already a saint in heaven; fragments of his garments were treasured as relics; he gathered a congregation of beatas and, after mass in his oratory, they would strip off their garments and dance with indecent vigor – drunk with the love of God – and, on some of his female penitents, he would impose the penance of lifting their skirts and exposing themselves before him." Méndez died before the Inquisition could bring him to trial.

Ignatius of Loyola, while studying at Salamanca in 1527, was brought before an ecclesiastical commission on a charge of sympathy with the alumbrados, but escaped with an admonition. Miguel de Molinos was also accused of sympathy owing to some similarities between his book The Spiritual Guide and the teachings of the early alumbrados, Isabel de la Cruz and Pedro Ruiz de Alcaraz.

A later case happened between the end of the 17th century and the beginning of the 18th century in Tenerife (Canary Islands). This concerned Sister María Justa de Jesús, a Franciscan nun who was accused of practicing Molinist doctrines (a Christian religious doctrine that attempts to reconcile God's providence with human free will). This nun was famous in her day because she was allegedly able to heal the sick by transferring to her person the evils and diseases that afflicted them, in a manner similar to shamans in other cultures. The case was investigated by the Holy Inquisition, and according to its files the nun was accused of being a phony and even a witch. She was also accused of having an improper relationship with her confessor. However, he had many defenders. After her death, the Franciscan Order in the Canary Islands initiated a process of canonization that had to be halted owing to the controversy.

== Correction ==
Their correction, by Inquisitional standards, was not particularly severe. Those convicted of engaging in the mystical practices and heresy of the alumbrados were not executed, few endured long-term sentences, and most were tried only after they managed to acquire large congregations in Toledo or Salamanca. Not all, however, were so fortunate. In 1529 a congregation of naïve adherents at Toledo were subjected to whippings and imprisonment. Greater rigors followed, and for about a century alleged connection with the alumbrados sent many to the Inquisition, especially at Córdoba. In spite of this determined action, however, the heresy maintained itself until the middle of the 17th century. The connection of later alumbrados, whose practices varied in different places, to the original alumbrados, Isabella de la Cruz and Pedro Ruiz del Alcaraz, is debatable, but the continuing influence of their teachings is not improbable.

== Bibliography ==
- López de Rojas, Gabriel. Sectas y órdenes. Martínez Roca (2007). ISBN 978-84-270-3405-1
- Alastair Hamilton (1992). Heresy and Mysticism in Sixteenth-Century Spain: the Alumbrados. James Clarke. ISBN 978-0-227-67921-0.
