= Myron of Sicyon =

Ancient Greek tyrant and Olympic victor

Personal information
- Born: 7th century BC Sicyon

Sport
- Event: Tethrippon
Medal record
Ancient Olympic Games
Representing Athens
Olympic Games
Gold medal – first place	648 BC Olympia	Tethrippon

Myron of Sicyon (Ancient Greek: Μύρων) was a tyrant of Sicyon and an Olympic victor in the equestrian event of the tethrippon (four-horse chariot race) at the 33rd Olympic Games of antiquity (648 BC).

== Biography ==
He was the brother of Orthagoras, who was also a tyrant, and succeeded him in power. Thus, he became the second ruler in the long-standing Orthagorid tyranny, which, according to Aristotle, was the longest-lasting tyranny in Ancient Greece, enduring for approximately 100 years. Myron was the father of the later tyrant Aristonymus, grandfather of the tyrant Cleisthenes, and an ancestor of the Athenian statesman Cleisthenes.

He was succeeded by Cleisthenes.

He was one of the first Greek rulers to seek the glory of Olympic victory in order to boost their popularity. According to the 2nd-century AD historian Pausanias, after his victory, Myron established the treasury of Sicyon at Olympia. Pausanias also notes that within this treasury he saw the ivory-made Horn of Amaltheia, which had been offered by the ruler of Callipolis, Miltiades the Elder.

== Bibliography ==
- Pausanias (1918). Description of Greece. Translated by Jones, W.H.S.; Ormerod, H.A. Cambridge, MA & London: Harvard University Press; William Heinemann Ltd.
- Smith, William (1848). A Dictionary of Greek and Roman Biography and Mythology. London: John Murray.
- Golden, Mark (2004). Sport in the Ancient World from A to Z. London: Routledge. p. 106. ISBN 978-1-134-53596-5.
- "GO ANTICHI 2 (PDF)" (PDF). sportolimpico.it (in Italian).
