= Diana de Armas Wilson =

American literary scholar (born 1934)

- Born: 1934 (age 91–92)
- Occupation: Literary scholar
- Children: 4 (including Andrea Nightingale)

Academic background
- Education: Cornell University; University of Denver
- Thesis: Cervantes' "Persiles y Sigismunda": an allegory of the couple (1981)
- Doctoral advisor: Leland H. Chambers

Academic work
- Sub-discipline: Cervantes
- Institutions: University of Denver

Diana de Armas Wilson (born 1934) is an American literary scholar who specializes in the work of the Spanish author Miguel de Cervantes. She was author of Allegories of Love (1991) and Cervantes, the Novel, and the New World (2000).

== Biography ==
Diana de Armas Wilson was born in 1934. Her father was a Spanish national from the island of La Gomera who emigrated to the United States with a Cuban cousin's birth certificate, bypassing the Immigration Act of 1924. She attended Cornell University, where she obtained her BA, and the University of Denver, where she obtained a PhD. Her doctoral dissertation Cervantes' "Persiles y Sigismunda": an allegory of the couple (1981) was supervised by Leland H. Chambers.

She later began working at the University of Denver, where she was part of the Department of English. Originally a full professor at the university, she eventually became a professor emerita.

In 1991, she published Allegories of Love, a study of the Cervantes novel Los trabajos de Persiles y Sigismunda. She later published another book Cervantes, the Novel, and the New World (2000), focusing on Cervantes' relationship with the New World. She also co-edited a Cervantes volume, Quixotic Desire (1993).

She was the translator for University of Notre Dame Press's 2011 edition of Antonio de Sosa's 1612 Topography of Algiers, with a second volume planned. She was editor for W. W. Norton & Company's 2020 version of Don Quixote. Her Spanish-language festschrift, Cervantes entre amigos (edited by Conxita Domènech and Andrés Lema-Hincapié), was published by Juan de la Cuesta Hispanic Monographs in 2024.

She has four daughters, including classical scholar Andrea Nightingale. She was a close friend of fellow Cervantes scholar Ruth El Saffar, who had to dictate the introduction of her book Rapture Encaged due to being hospitalized during the last year of her life.

== Bibliography ==
- Allegories of Love (1991) (Note: Reviews of this book:)
- Quixotic Desire (1993; co-edited with Ruth El Saffar)
- Cervantes, the Novel, and the New World (2000) (Note: Reviews of this book:)
