= Sister María Justa de Jesús =

Spanish Franciscan nun and mystic

- Born: María Justa; January 6, 1667; La Victoria de Acentejo, Tenerife
- Died: 1723 (aged 55–56); La Orotava, Tenerife
- Occupations: Nun and mystic

María Justa de Jesús (January 6, 1667 - 1723) was a Spanish Franciscan nun and mystic who was tried as a witch during the Inquisition.

== Early life ==
She was born in La Victoria de Acentejo on the north of the island of Tenerife in the Spanish Canary Islands. She trained as a Franciscan in the Saint Joseph Convent in La Orotava. Her life was involved in mysticism and controversy.

== Career ==
The Holy Inquisition tried her as a witch. She was accused of practicing Molinist doctrines. It was hinted that the relationship with her confessor was not appropriate for a religious person. Her biographer and confessor, Andrés de Abreu, burned the biography he had written about her. However, Dominican friar Jose Herrera said that among her virtues was to give sight to the blind, to make the deaf hear, the mute to speak, heal the lame, heal diseases and expel demons.

Sr. Maria Justa reportedly healed the sick by transferring to her person the evils and diseases that afflicted them, similar to shamanic in other cultures. That similarity fed the suspicions of those who called her an alumbrada. During her legendary healings, the nun was described as suffering multiple ailments, covering her body in sores and elevating her body temperature, which seemed to bring her to the brink of death.

== Death ==
Sister Maria Justa died in 1723. According to the chronicles of the time, her body showed signs of sanctity, such as flexibility, pleasant fragrances and fluidity of her blood. After her death, the Franciscan Order in the Canary Islands conducted a process of canonization that was later halted.

== Alumbrados ==
Her case was ascribed to the phenomenon of the "Alumbrados" that arose in small Castilian towns two centuries earlier. These were people who professed doctrines considered heretical by the Catholic Church, believing that union with God came only through mystical experiences and private prayer, without the need for Church sacraments.

== See also ==
- List of saints of the Canary Islands
