= Orthagoras =

Ancient Greek tyrant of Sicyon

Orthagoras was a tyrant of ancient Sicyon in the mid-7th century BC. He founded the Orthagorid tyranny, which, according to Aristotle, was the longest-lasting tyranny in Greece (approximately 100 years).

He came from an aristocratic family of Sicyon. Gifted and bold, he gained military fame and the respect of the people due to his success in the war against neighboring Pellene. Around 670 BC, he rose to power as a tyrant. Some sources—particularly Aristotle—depict him as a demagogue, but this is inaccurate. In truth, he strongly supported the farmers and persecuted the old noble families. He also protected trade and craftsmanship.

His successor was his brother, Myron.

== Bibliography ==
- Pausanias. Description of Greece. Translated by W.H.S. Jones and H.A. Ormerod. 4 vols. Cambridge, MA: Harvard University Press; London: William Heinemann Ltd., 1918. Online at Perseus
- Aristotle. Politics. In Aristotle in 23 Volumes, Vol. 21. Translated by H. Rackham. Cambridge, MA: Harvard University Press; London: William Heinemann Ltd., 1944. Online at Perseus
- Plutarch. De sera numinis vindicta. Edited by Gregorius N. Bernardakis. Leipzig: Teubner, 1891. Online at Perseus
- Plutarch. Concerning Such Whom God Is Slow To Punish. In The Moralia. Translations edited by William Watson Goodwin, 1878 edition. § 7. Online at ToposText
- Helmut Berve: Tyranny between the Greeks, 2 volumes, Munich, 1967
- Loretana de Libero: The archaic tyranny, Stuttgart 1996
- Kordatos, Giannis. Great History of Greece. Athens: 20th Century. p. 324
