= Andrea Nightingale =

American philosopher

- Born: 1959 (age 66–67)
- Education: University of California at Berkeley
- Mother: Diana de Armas Wilson
- Scientific career
- Fields: Ancient Philosophy
- Workplaces: Stanford University

Andrea Wilson Nightingale (born 1959) is an American scholar working in the field of Classics. She is a Professor of Classics at Stanford University. She works on Ancient philosophy and literature, focusing on the intersection of philosophy and literature. She has also taught and written on ecological issues from a literary and philosophical point of view.

== Life ==
Nightingale was born to Cervantes scholar Diana de Armas Wilson and Douglas Wilson. She was educated at Stanford University (BA in Classics), Magdelen College, Oxford (2nd BA in Classics), and at the University of California, Berkeley (PhD in Classics).

She has been awarded the Marshall Scholarship, the Guggenheim Fellowship, a fellowship from the American Council of Learned Societies, and a fellowship at the Stanford Humanities Center. She has also received the Gordon and Dailey Pattee Faculty Fellowship (1999-2000) and the Deans Teaching Award at Stanford (1996-1997).

Nightingale was appointed as a Comparative Literature Professor at Stanford in September 2004. She served as a Stanford Fellow from 2004 to 2006. She served as a Harvard Senior Fellow of the Center for Hellenic Studies from 2009 to 2013.

== Works ==
- Genres in Dialogue: Plato and the Construct of Philosophy, Cambridge: Cambridge University Press, 1995, ISBN 0521774330
- Spectacles of Truth in Classical Greek Philosophy: Theoria in its Cultural Context, Cambridge: Cambridge University Press, 2004, ISBN 0521117798
- Ancient Models of Mind: Studies in Human and Divine Rationality, Cambridge: Cambridge University Press, 2010 (co-editor), ISBN 0521113555
- Once out of Nature: Augustine on Time and the Body, Chicago: University of Chicago Press, 2011, ISBN 0226585751

== Radio shows ==
- “Epicurus and Epicureanism,” one-hour show on “ Entitled Opinions (on Life and Literature)” with Robert Harrison (KZSU 90.1 FM), Nov. 8, 2005.
- “Plato and Love and Beauty,” one-hour show on “Entitled Opinions (on Life and Literature)” with Robert Harrison (KZSU 90.1 FM), Nov. 26, 2009.
- “Moby Dick,” one-hour show on “Entitled Opinions (on Life and Literature)” with Robert Harrison (KZSU 90.1 FM), Jan. 11, 2011.
