= Quixotic Desire =

1993 volume

- Title page for Quixotic Desire: Psychoanalytic Perspectives on Cervantes (1993)
- Editor: Ruth El Saffar and Diana de Armas Wilson
- Language: English
- Subject: Miguel de Cervantes (particularly Don Quixote)
- Genre: History; psychoanalysis
- Published: 1993
- Publisher: Cornell University Press
- ISBN: 9781501734205
- OCLC: 1129186585

Quixotic Desire: Psychoanalytic Perspectives on Cervantes is a 1993 volume edited by Ruth El Saffar and Diana de Armas Wilson. It examines the work of the Spanish writer Miguel de Cervantes (most notably Don Quixote) through psychoanalytic perspectives, including those by Sigmund Freud and Jacques Lacan. Within a few years of publication, it received praise for its potential to change Cervantine studies.

== Contents ==
Quixotic Desire is composed on essays centered on the work of Cervantes (especially Don Quixote) through the lens of psychoanalysis, with the introduction noting that the latter "works as a valuable and viable critical mode because—in its best moments—it posits, in both literary and interpretive texts, that the psyche functions as an organizing principle, constantly creating itself through the images and lexicons out of which it gains material expression". The volume's fifteen essays are organized into five sections:

1. "The Discourse of Affiliation", which has only one essay: where psychoanalysts León Grinberg and Juan Francisco Rodríguez examine how Don Quixote influenced Freud's work.
2. "The Discourse of Desire", composed of essays on the theme of desire, particularly in El curioso impertinente; Cervantes' ability to channel the Ancient Greek dream interpreter Artemidorus "even as he anticipates Freud"; and analysis of the unconscious in reader interpretation through Cervantes' autobiographical work.
3. "Fragmented Heroes, Fragmented Texts", made of three essays on Freudian fragmentation, with subject matter including the role of the titular story's "educated men" as the Lacanian name of the father, the sexual aspects of the scene where Don Quixote is hung by his wrist, and Sancho's unconscious emotions through Jokes and Their Relation to the Unconscious.
4. "The Other's Story: Interpolation and Disruption", centered on the book's side-story characters, specifically the role of gender in Marcela's journey, the connection of Cardenio's feelings with desire and submission, and reinterpretations of El curioso impertinente and the story of the captive through the theories of Freud and Guy Hocquenghem, respectively.
5. "The Mother's Story: Incorporation and Abjection", the final section, which changes the work's scope to Cervantes' non-Quixote work, exploring them through the Jungian witch; subject matter includes the influence of Cervantes' unconscious Terrible Mother on his work, the concept of the missing mother in La tía fingida, as well as well as re-examinations of The Dialogue of the Dogs through the theories of Nicolas Abraham, Freud, Julia Kristeva, Lacan, and Mária Török.

In addition to the co-authored first part, as well as two essays written by the volume editors individually, contributors to the volume were Andrew Bush, Anthony J. Cascardi, Anne J. Cruz, Carlos Feal, María Antonia Garcés, Mary Malcolm Gaylord, Eduardo González, Mary S. Gossy, Carroll B. Johnson, Maurice Molho, George A. Shipley, and Paul Julian Smith.

== Release and reception ==
Quixotic Desire was released by Cornell University Press in 1993. The book was edited by Ruth El Saffar and Diana de Armas Wilson.

Eduardo Urbina noted most of the essays were "better grounded in the intricacies and subtleties of post-Freudian and postmodern criticism", and he praised some of the essays, calling Cascardi's essay as "intelligent and solid", noting the detail of Cruz's essay, and singling out El Saffar's essay due to its use of post-Freudian psychoanalysis to explain Marcela's character arc, but criticized the essays by Shipley and Smith for issues with transparency and being "overdone and unconvincing", respectively. Catherine Larson praised the analysis in the work as "clear and thoughtful", and also noted how diverse the methodologies and psychoanalytic trends were in the book. Michael McGaha praised several essays for combining psychoanalysis and literary scholarship but criticized the others for lacking textual evidence.

Larson called Quixotic Desire a "manifest contribution to Cervantine studies", saying that it "challenges the ways readers have thought and talked about Cervantes for hundreds of years". Urbina said of the book: "This attractive volume is a model of editorial control and critical vision and represents a valuable contribution to the psychoanalytic study of Cervantes." Gregory S. Hutcheson noted that the author's "commitment to Cervantine studies is legendary, manifesting itself most recently and most dramatically in Quixotic Desire". McGaha called the volume's essays "an excellent introduction to the many different types of psychoanalysis and psychoanalytic criticism currently being practiced".

== See also ==
- Psychoanalytic literary criticism
