= Isabel de la Cruz =

Spanish mystic

- Born: Guadalajara
- Occupation(s): Mystic, Seamstress
- Movement: Alumbrados

Isabel de la Cruz (fl. 1512–1540) was a Spanish mystic active in the 16th century.

She was a co-founder of the Alumbrados movement.

== Biography ==
Isabel de la Cruz was born in Guadalajara to a family of seamstresses descended from New Christians, and had multiple mystical experiences as a child. She was the subject of a long heresy trial by the Spanish Inquisition, lasting between 1524 and 1529. Her Enlightenment movement gained traction in Castilla La Nueva until 1524, when a new Inquisition process sent her to jail after performing auto de fe. She influenced Ruiz de Alacraz, who was found between her disciples, and also the blessed María de Cazalla.
