= Silsden Hoard =

Celtic coin hoard from West Yorkshire, England

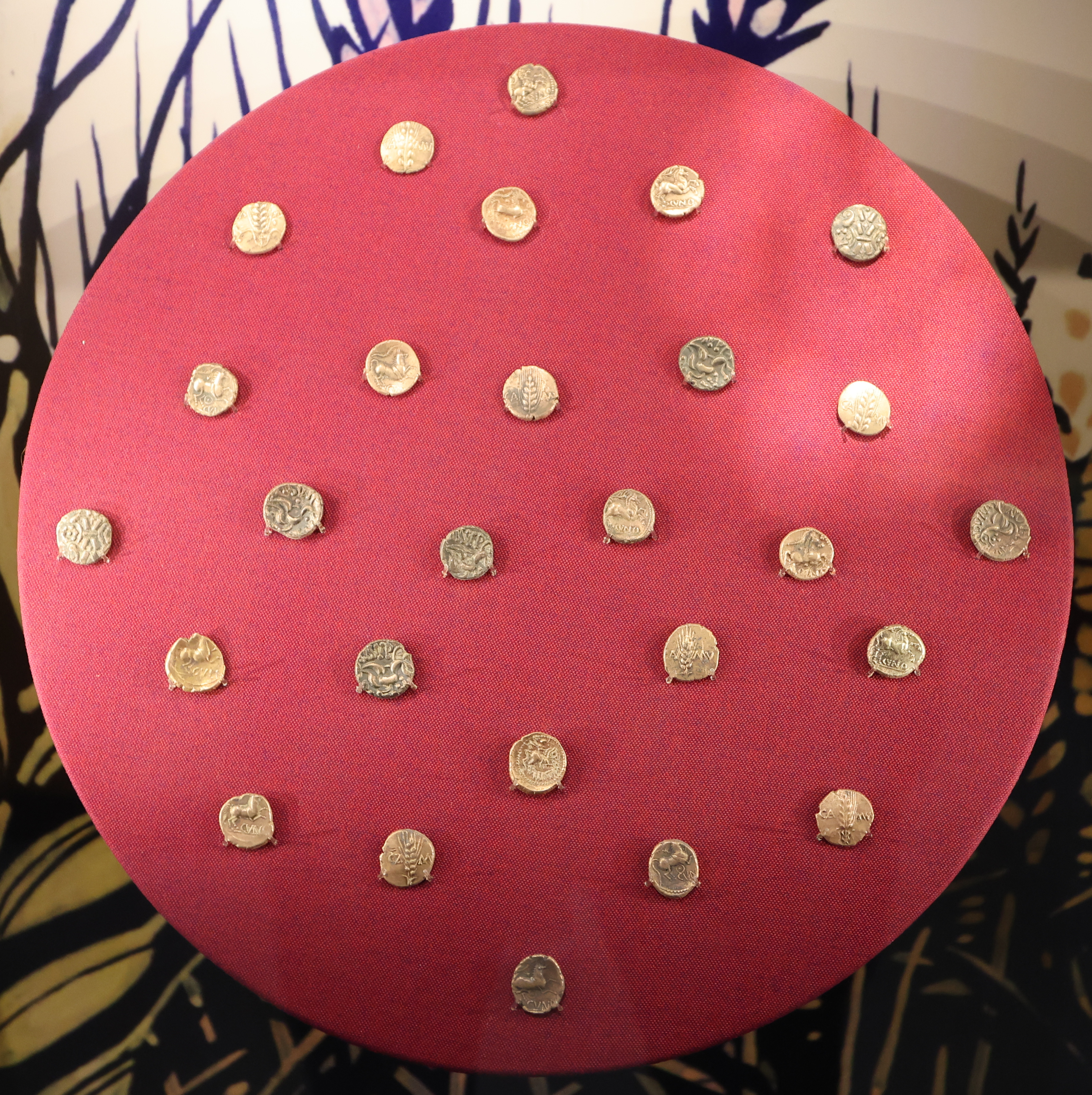
The coins of the Silsden Hoard

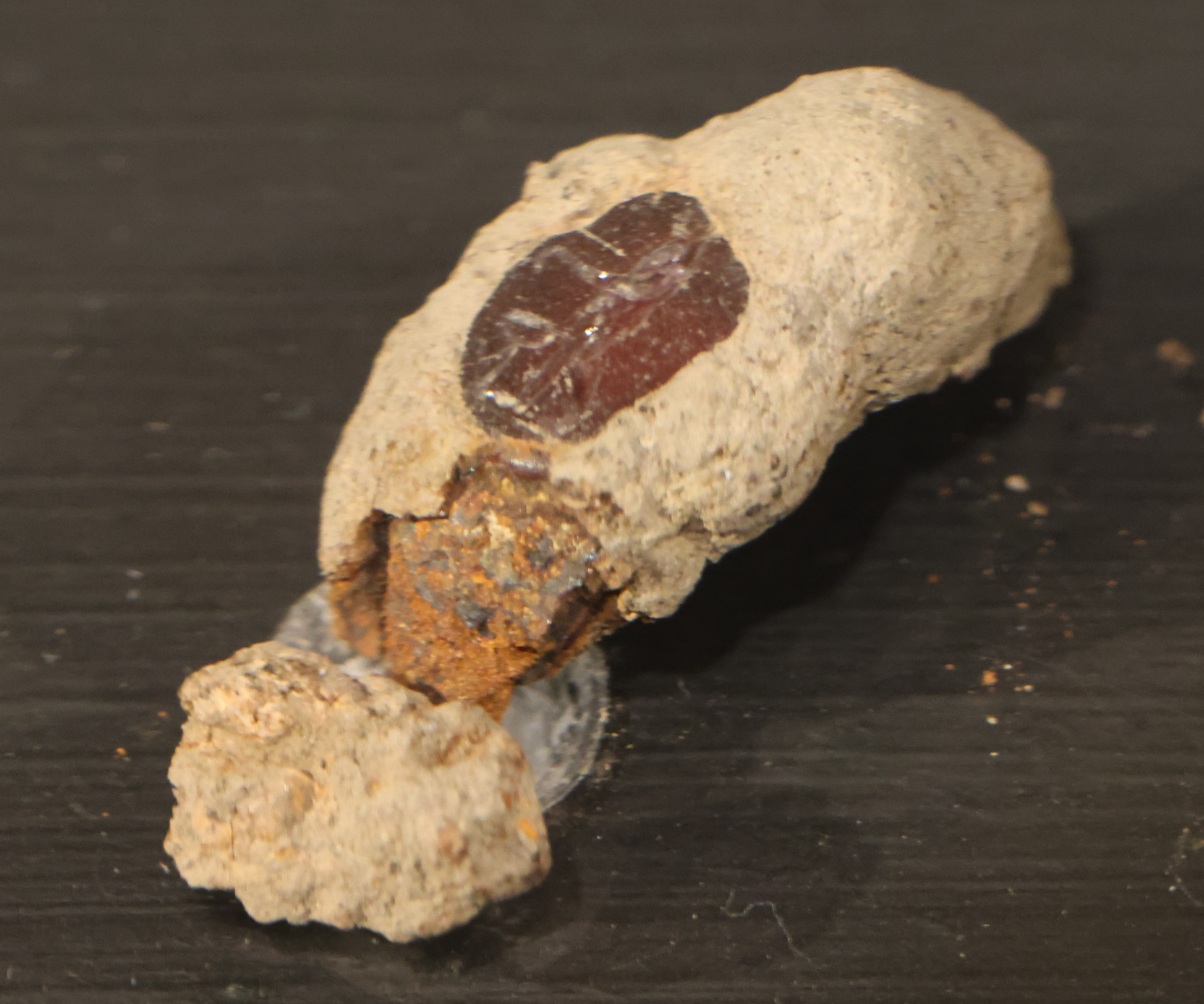
The iron finger ring

The Silsden Hoard is an assemblage containing 27 gold coins of the late British Iron Age and a Roman iron finger ring.

== Discovery ==
The hoard was discovered in 1998 by Jeff Walbank using a metal detector in a field at Silsden in West Yorkshire, England. The hoard was declared to be treasure before being acquired by Bradford Art Galleries and Museums in 2000. The hoard is now on display at Cliffe Castle Museum in Keighley, near where it was found.

== Contents of the Hoard ==
The Silsden Hoard was found to contain 27 gold staters dating from the 1st century AD. 19 of the coins were issued by Cunobelinus at various times throughout his reign. One was issued by his brother Epaticcus. Seven coins of the Corieltauvi were also part of the hoard.

In addition to the coins, an iron finger ring, almost certainly of Roman provenance (particularly Augustan or Julio-Claudian), was also found. The intaglio depicts a maenad performing ritual ablutions, and is based on a 4th-century sculpture by Roman sculptor Lysippos of Sicyon. Archaeologist Martin Henig has suggested the ring belonged to a member of the court of Brigantine queen Cartimandua. The exact means of how the ring came to be a part of the hoard are still subject to debate.

== Historical background ==
The hoard is one of three found in the former territories of the Brigantes, all of which contain Corieltauvian coins. It is thought the hoards were deposited by British refugees fleeing the Roman invasion of AD 43, under Emperor Claudius and, as such, may be associated with accounts of the flight of Caratacus, the son of Cunobelinus, whose policies were used by the Romans as a pretext for the invasion.

== See also ==
- List of hoards in Britain

== Sources ==
- Edwards, Gavin; Dennis, Megan (2006). "The Silsden hoard: discovery, investigation and new interpretations". In de Jersey, Philip (ed.). Celtic Coinage: New Discoveries, New Discussion. BAR Publishing. doi:10.30861/9781841719672. ISBN 9781841719672.
- Henig, Martin (2007). "'The Race that is Set Before Us': The Athletic Ideal in the Aesthetics and Culture of Early Roman Britain". In Gosden, Chris; Hamerow, Helena; Lock, Gary; de Jersey, Philip (eds.). Communities and Connections: Essays in Honour of Barry Cunliffe. Oxford University Press. pp. 449–464. doi:10.1093/oso/9780199230341.001.0001. ISBN 9780191528118.
