= Praying Boy =

Praying Boy may refer to:

- the Berlin Adorant, a Hellenistic bronze sculpture
- an artwork by Banksy, see List of works by Banksy that have been damaged or destroyed
