= Oil Pourer =

Lost Greek bronze of an athlete

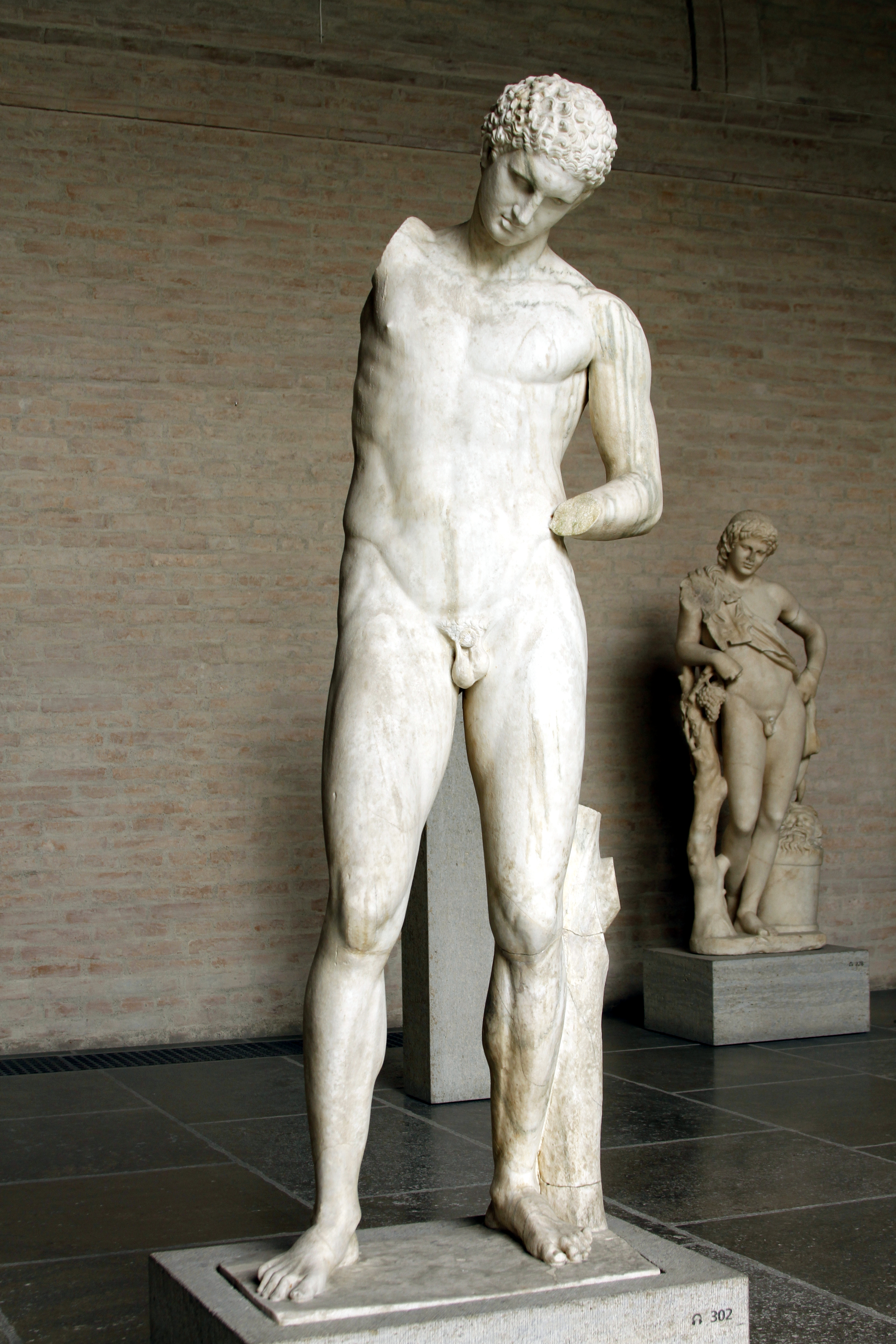
The Oil Pourer, after Lysippos (Glyptothek, Munich)

The Oil Pourer is a lost Greek bronze of an athlete variously associated with the circle of Lysippos, c. 340-330 BCE, of which Roman marble copies exist, notably in the Glyptothek, Munich (illustration) and in the Albertinum, Dresden. Another well-known Roman replica is conserved at Petworth House. There is a head of this type at the Boston Museum of Fine Arts. The Oil Pourer is similar in proportions and manner to the Lysippean Agias of which there is a Roman marble copy at Delphi.

The athlete is represented pouring oil from a flask held high in his (missing) right hand into the (missing) palm of his left. The theme is represented on Attic vase-painting and in freely reinterpreted cast terracotta miniatures.

The Munich sculpture was treated in the 19th century with acid to clean it, which has dissolved about 2mm off its surfaces.
