= Berlin Adorant =

Ancient Greek bronze statue

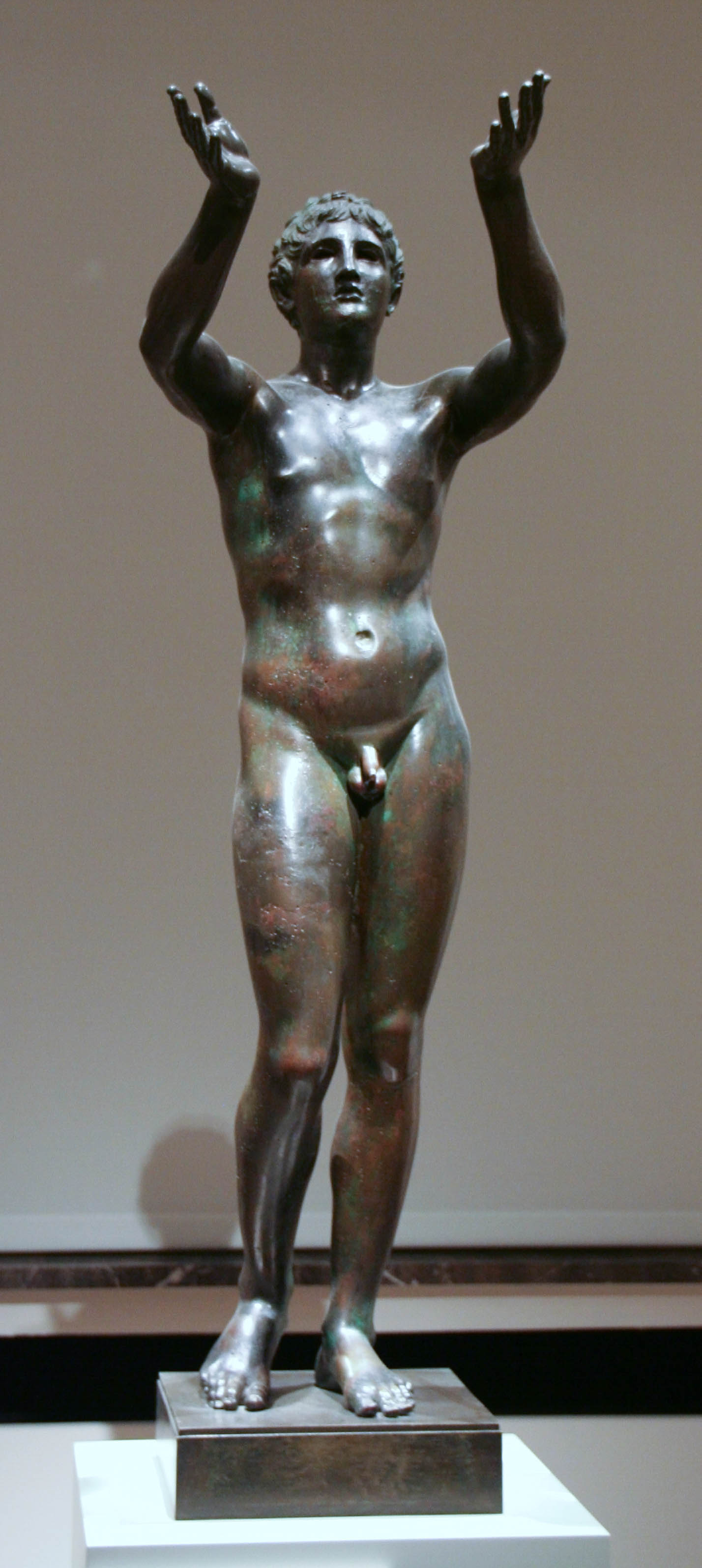
The Praying Boy, Altes Museum

The Praying Boy (in German, Der betende Knabe), also known as the Berlin Adorant, is an Ancient Greek bronze statue of a naked male youth with arms raised, which stands 128 cm (50 in) high, at or perhaps slightly smaller than life size. Sculpted in a Hellenistic style, it is dated to c.300BC, and attributed to the school of Lysippos. It is held by the Altes Museum in Berlin.

== History ==
Metallurgical analysis indicates the statue was made in the Hellenistic period. Stylistic similarities to a bust of Demetrius I of Macedon (now in Naples) indicates the statue may have been made by Teisikrates, a grandson of Lysippos, around 300BC. Others attribute it to Boidas, a son of Lysippos, relying on a reference to a statue of a praying boy mentioned in Pliny's Natural History.

=== Excavation ===
The incomplete bronze statue, initially missing arms and legs, was found on the island of Rhodes in the late 1400s during the construction of city walls. It arrived in Venice in 1503. The left leg was recovered and reunited with the head and torso in the 16th century. The statue passed through a number of prominent art collections, including the collections of Count Mario Bevilacqua in Verona, Duke Vincenzo Gonzaga in Mantua, and the Royal Collection of Charles I. The arms are reconstructions which were commissioned in the 17th century by Nicolas Fouquet, the last Superintendent of Finances of King Louis XIV. The restored statue was displayed at Fouquet's Château de Vaux-le-Vicomte. It later passed through the collections of Prince Eugene of Savoy and Prince Wenzel of Liechtenstein.

It was sold to King Frederick II of Prussia in 1747, who displayed it on a terrace at Sanssouci Palace in Potsdam until 1786, when it was moved inside at the Berlin Stadtschloss. It was removed by Napoleon in 1806 and displayed at the Musée Napoléon in Paris. It was bought and donated to the collection of the Altes Museum. It was removed by Soviet authorities to Saint Petersburg for a period after the Second World War, but returned to the museum in East Berlin in 1958 along with other antiquities including the Pergamon Altar.

Numerous repairs have been required over the last 500 years, including replacement of parts of the feet and toes. The position of the restored arms has led to the interpretation of the statue as praying, but no interpretation is universally accepted. It has been suggested that the statue may represent Apollo or Ganymede, or perhaps an athlete or a shepherd. It may have formed part of a larger sculptural group.

== See also ==
- Piraeus Athena
- Las Incantadas
- Aphrodite of Rhodes
- Artemision Bronze

== Gallery ==
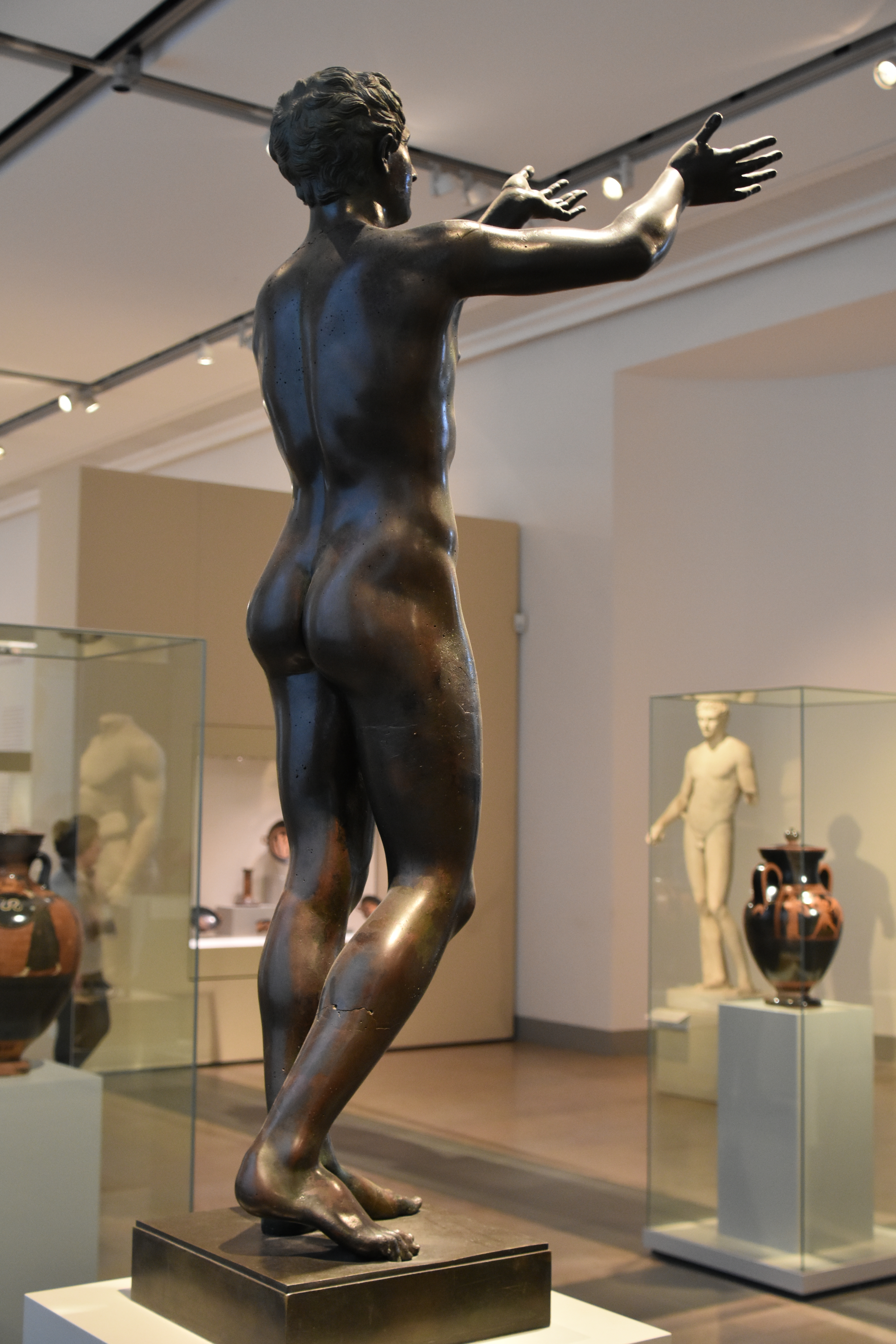
rear view

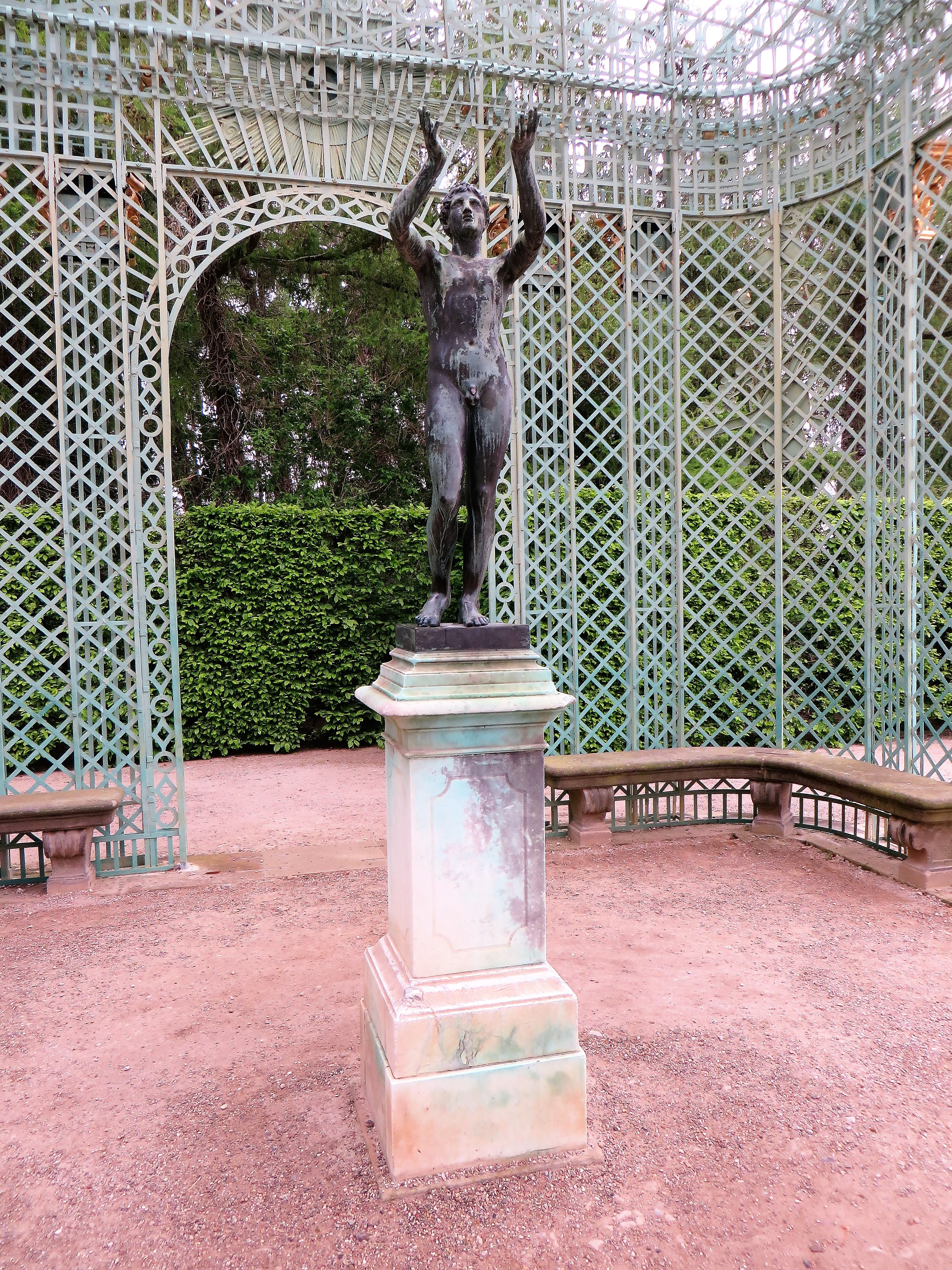
copy on display at Sansoussi

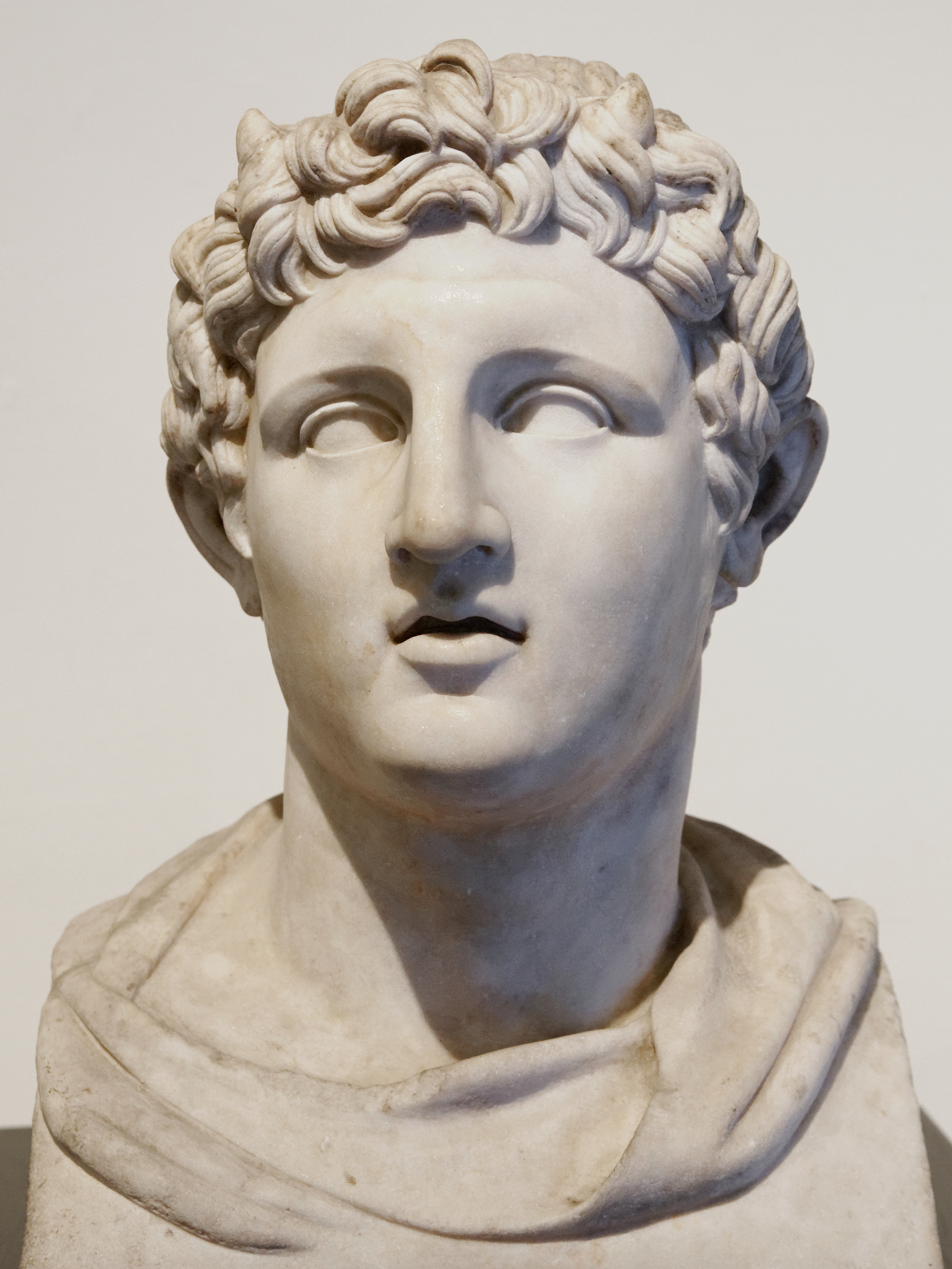
Roman copy of a Greek bust of Demetrius I of Macedon
