= Cliffe Castle Museum =

Museum in Keighley, England

Coordinates: 53°52′31″N 1°54′49″W

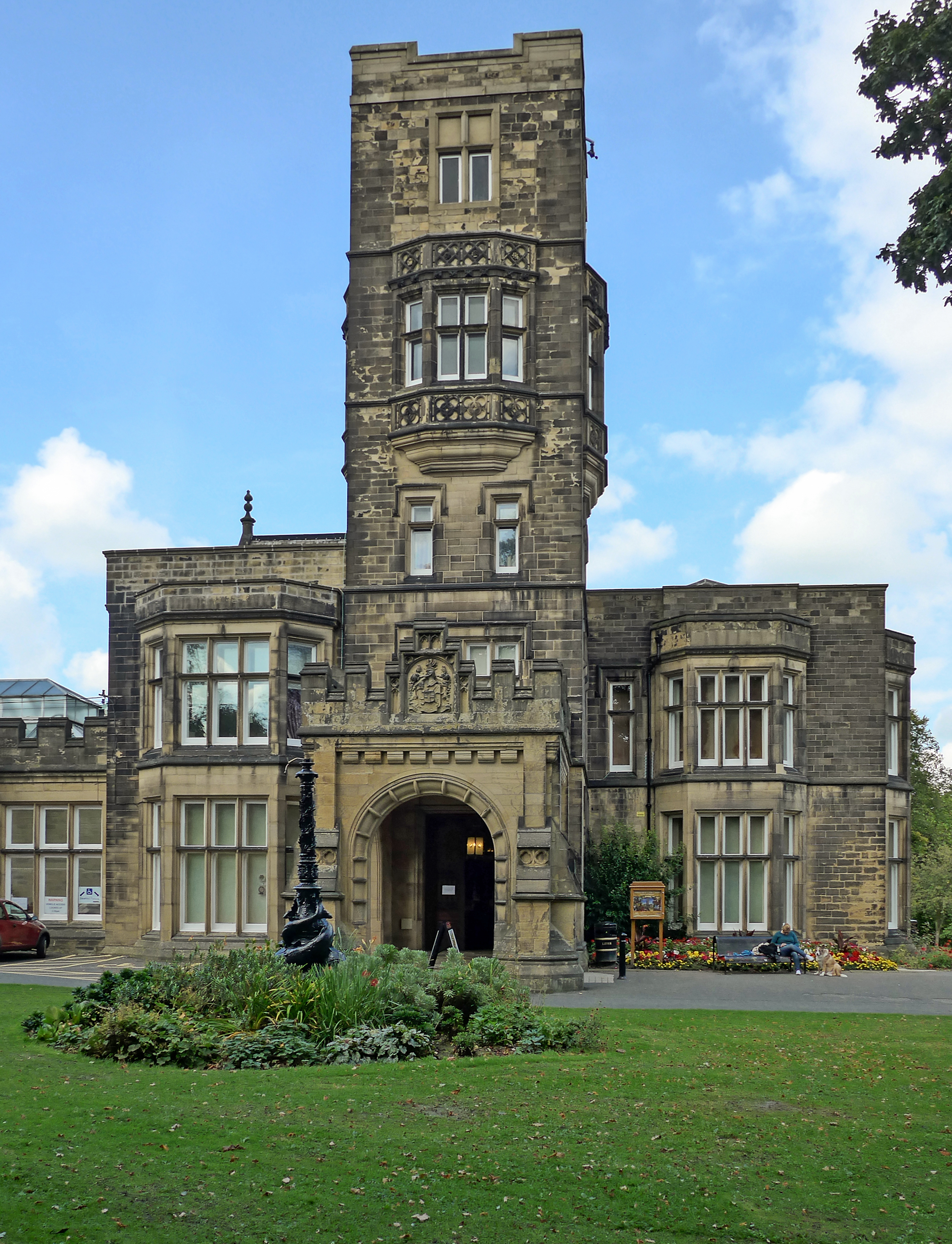
- Cliffe Castle Museum, Keighley
- Established: c. 1892 as Keighley Museum at Eastwood House, Keighley. Reopened in 1959 at the former Cliffe Hall as Cliffe Castle Museum.
- Location: Spring Gardens Lane, Keighley, West Yorkshire, England BD20 6LH
- Type: Heritage centre, Historic house museum.
- Visitors: 65,000 (2010)
- Public transit access: Keighley railway station; bus information from Bradford Interchange
- Website: www.bradfordmuseums.org

Cliffe Castle Museum, Keighley, West Yorkshire, England, is a local heritage museum which opened in the grand, Victorian, neo-Gothic Cliffe Castle in 1959. Originating as Cliffe Hall in 1828, the museum is the successor to Keighley Museum which opened in Eastwood House, Keighley, in c. 1892. There is a series of galleries dedicated to various aspects of local heritage, and to displaying the house itself, which is a Grade II listed building.

== History ==
It is believed that Keighley Museum was established in 1893, because that is when its first location, Eastwood House, Keighley, was purchased for the public. In 1950 the local benefactor Sir Bracewell Smith purchased Cliffe Castle, and had it redesigned as a museum and art gallery for the people of Keighley. The museum re-opened as Cliffe Castle Museum and Art Gallery in 1959.

=== The building ===
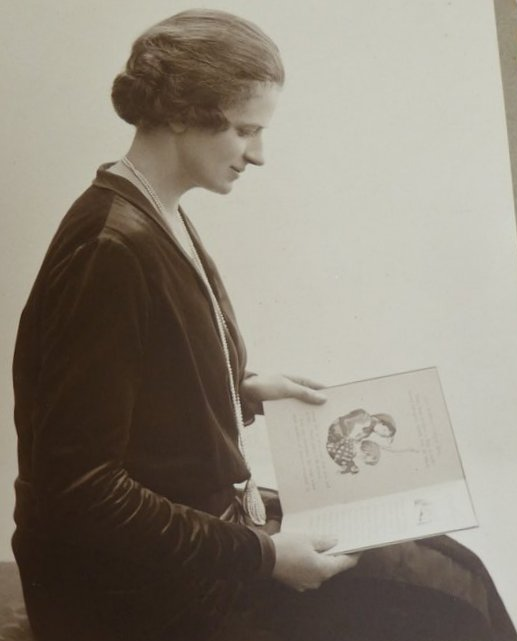
Countess Manvers

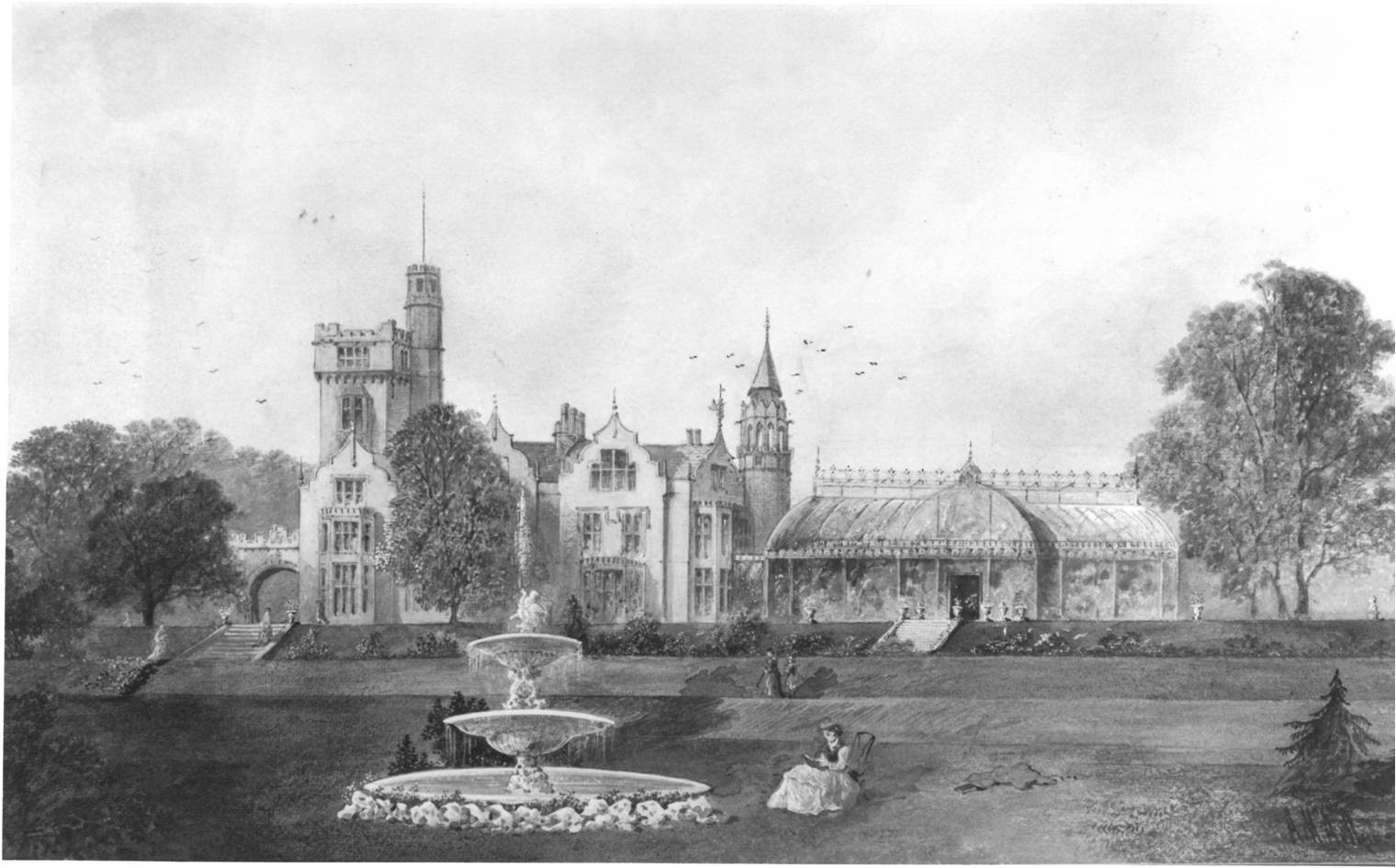
Cliffe Hall, later Cliffe Castle, circa 1880

Cliffe Hall was built by Christopher Netherwood between 1828 and 1833, and designed by George Webster of Kendal, a gothic revivalist. The Butterfields, a textile manufacturing family, bought Cliffe Hall in 1848. Henry Isaac Butterfield transformed the building by adding towers, a ballroom and conservatories from 1875 to 1880, and renamed it Cliffe Castle in 1878. He decorated the building with the griffin motif, which he had adopted as a heraldic crest. Sir Nicholas Pevsner describes the building as having an asymmetrically placed tower and Jacobean shaped gables.

By 1887, the Cliffe Castle Estate had around 300 acres. The son of Henry Isaac Butterfield (1819–1910) was Sir Frederick William Louis Butterfield (1858–1943). In 1916, Sir Frederick became Mayor of Keighley and held that title until 1918 when he hosted a visit to the town by King George V and Queen Mary on 29 May of that year. Sir Frederick's daughter, Marie-Louise Roosevelt Butterfield (1889–1984), married in 1918 and later became Marie-Louise Roosevelt Pierrepont, Countess Manvers. Sir Frederick died in 1943 and on 21 July of that year his daughter Marie-Louise, Countess Manvers inherited the Cliffe Castle Estate and took some of the contents of Cliffe Castle to her home at Thoresby Hall.

In 1949, the building and grounds were bought by Keighley Corporation with the assistance of Sir Bracewell Smith, a local benefactor, who in 1955, paid for the conversion of the house for public use. The house had been gabled in the neo-Gothic style, with tall towers each end, and conservatories. In the interests of modernisation, the back tower was taken down, and the front one shortened. The high Flemish gables and other decorations were removed from the roof, and the conservatories demolished. The service rooms were replaced by the octagonal art gallery in the 1950s. The exterior fantasy design was lost but some of the neo-Gothic interior has been recreated. By 1989, Thoresby Hall, the former home of the late Countess Manvers, and its contents, had been sold off. Various artefacts were brought back to Cliffe Castle from where they came with the help of a public appeal. Some items were borrowed and are also displayed in the museum.

== Galleries and rooms ==
=== Entrance vestibule, Reception rooms and Great Drawing Room ===
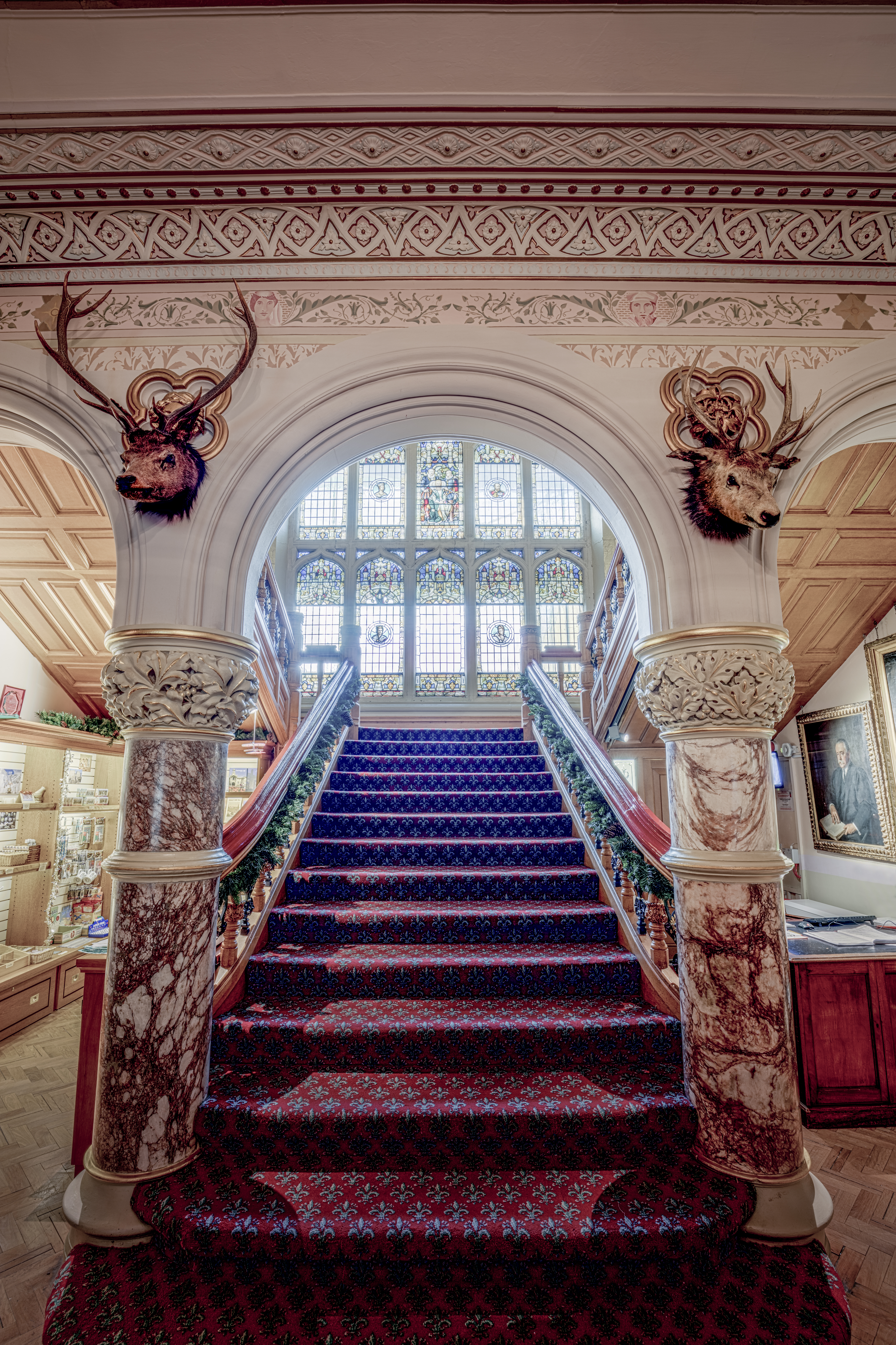
Main staircase

The vestibule and staircase show the Victorian eclectic Gothic Revivalist taste. The hammer-beam roof over the staircase imitates the 15th century, the staircase window the 14th century, and the vestibule arches the 13th century.

The window was designed by Powells of Leeds. The top roundel features a copy of Raphael's Madonna and Child. All ten main lights of the window once contained Victorian figures in Tudor costume, but most of these were removed by Frederick Butterfield, to be replaced with clear lights or small roundels. In the vestibule and reception rooms are life-sized portraits of Napoleon III and Empress Eugenie.

=== Working Landscapes gallery, the Airedale gallery, Archaeology Area gallery and Natural History gallery ===
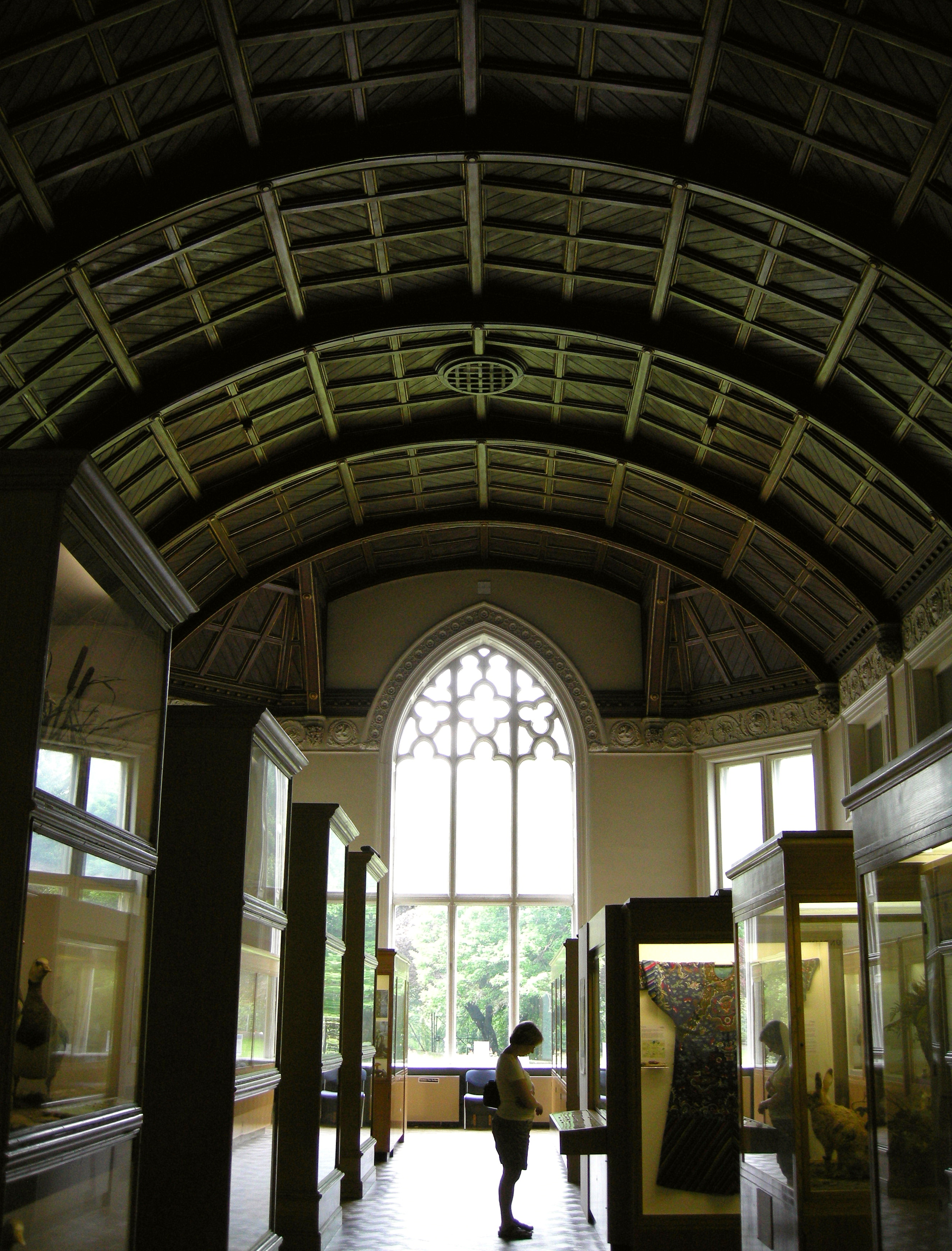
Natural History gallery with barrel-vaulted roof

The Working Landscapes gallery displays local crafts and trades of the past. There is a video of clog-making which continued into the 20th century. The Airedale gallery display shows how the River Aire was formed, and shows fossils of its earliest animals. The Archaeology Area display features the Silsden Roman treasure. The Natural History gallery was once the Butterfields' ballroom. It is now full of mounted animals and birds. There is a family of tawny owls and a birdsong display. The mounted emu given by Ilkley Museum in 1928 is no longer evident, but there are many other examples of the taxidermist's craft.

=== Molecules to Minerals gallery ===
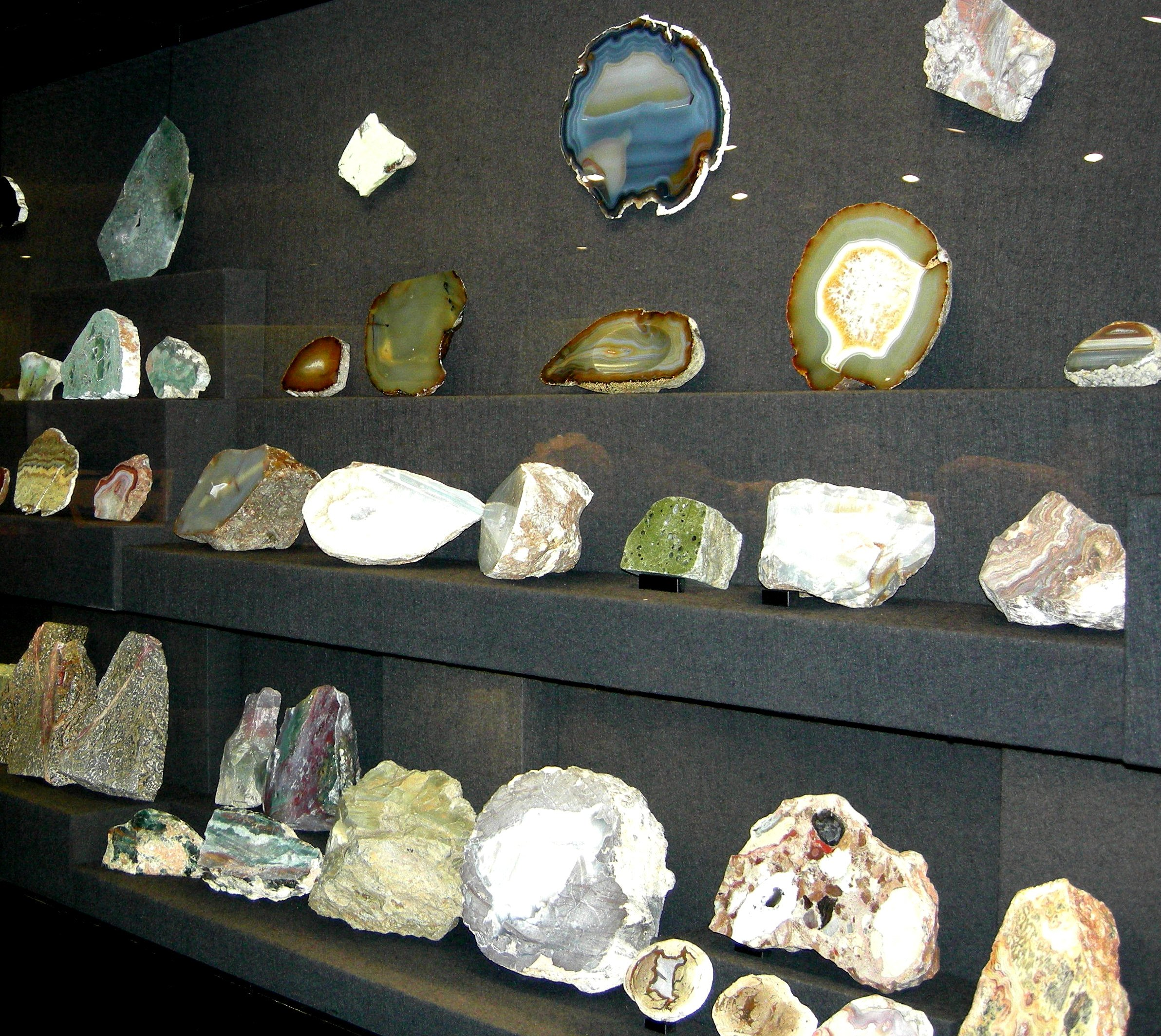
Minerals display, including coloured agates

This display was created in 1988, and incorporates collections from several museums in the Bradford area. It includes the Ellison Collection, given by Ilkley Museum in 1928. Very few of the collections are named in the display.

Some of the specimens are from the Hinchcliffe Collection. This comprises 800 specimens from the Gem Rock Museum at Heaton, Bradford, bought with grants and public subscription from George Hinchcliffe in 1984. The display explains how minerals are different from rocks, and has sections about: mineral colour; streak; hardness; magnetism; fluorescence; fracture; chemical classification; crystal shape, crystallisation, chemistry and occurrence. There are over a thousand specimens here, including a display of glowing rocks.

=== Sir Bracewell Smith Hall ===
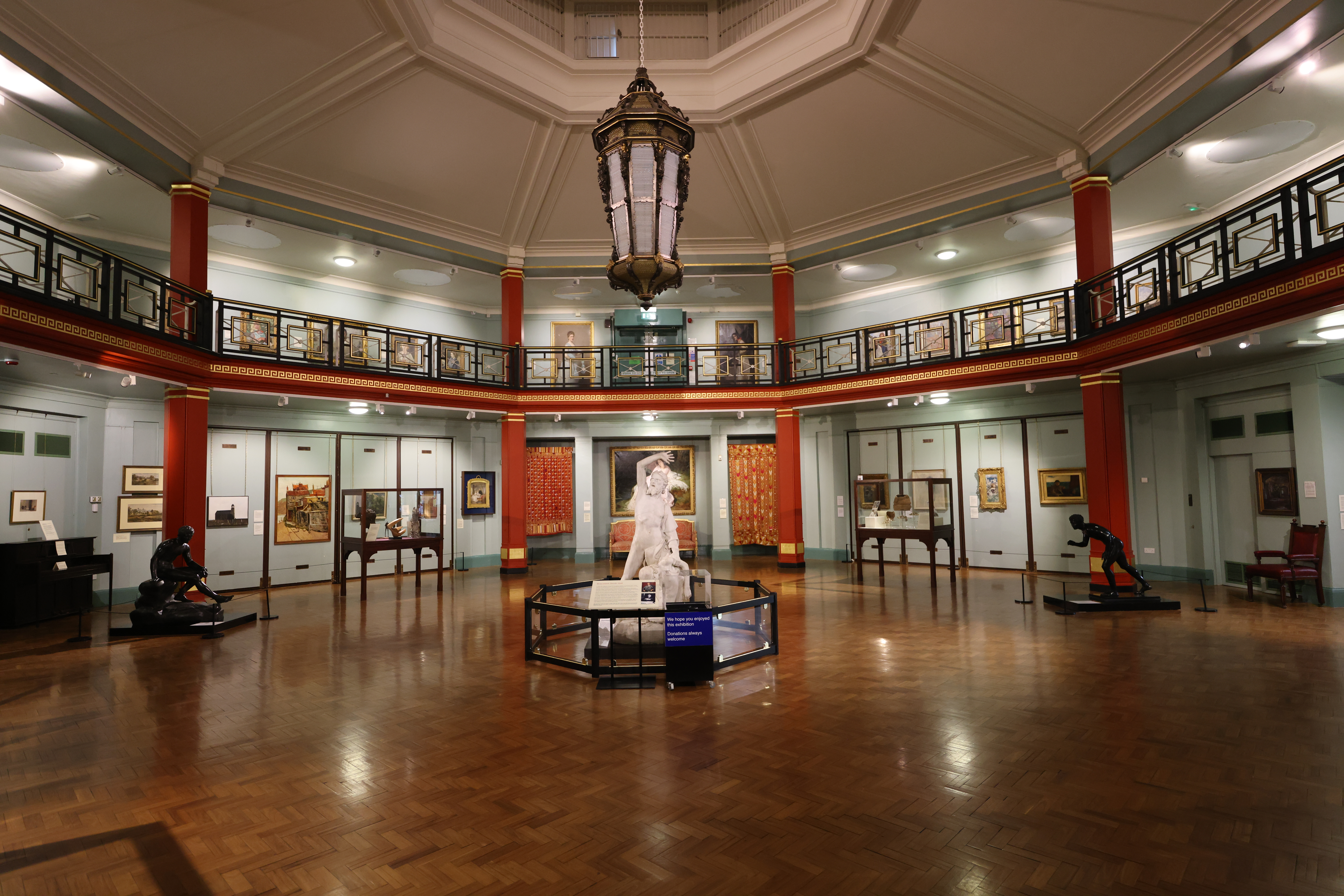
Bracewell Smith Hall

This space was created in the 1950s when the castle was converted to a museum. It was restored to its original colour scheme in 2013, and the Octagonal lantern returned to its former position in the hall. The octagonal lantern was specifically designed for the space by Sir Albert Richardson in the 1950s, who was the architect who led the conversion of the building. It is sometimes incorrectly referenced as a 19th-century Chinese lantern.

The colour scheme and gilding was restored on the basis of paint scrapings, confirmed by a painting of the hall design done by Sir Albert Richardson, which can be seen within the space itself. Prior to refurbishment, the space was used to host temporary exhibitions, it now displays a permanent selection of items that have been selected from the museum collections.

=== The Egyptians gallery ===
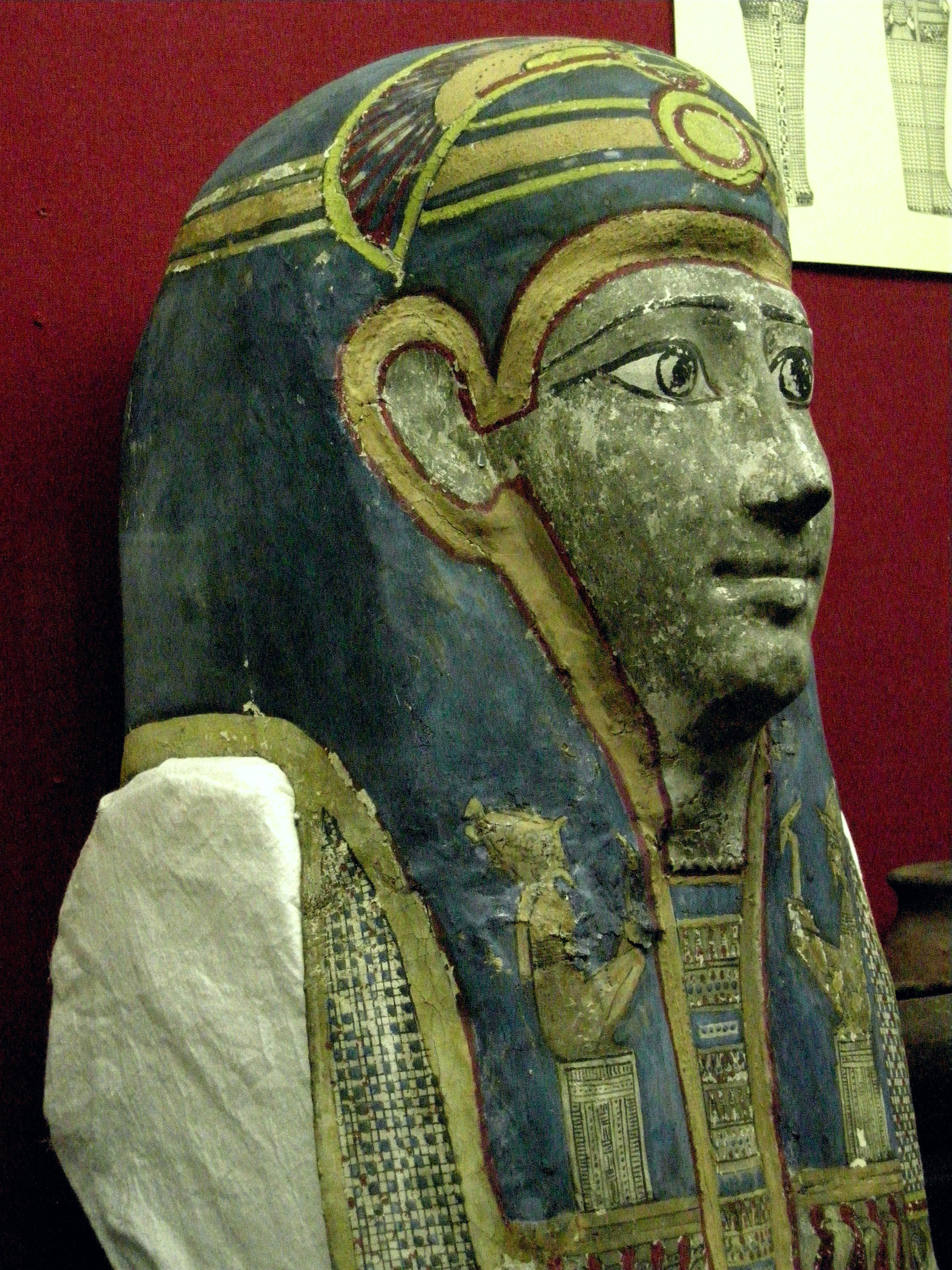
Ancient Egyptian mask

The display includes a mummy of an Egyptian girl dating from the Ptolemaic dynasty (c. 250 BCE), and covers the Ancient Egyptian belief in the afterlife.

=== Breakfast Room ===
This downstairs room acts as an accessible space for themes covered upstairs.

=== Conservatory and stained glass gallery ===
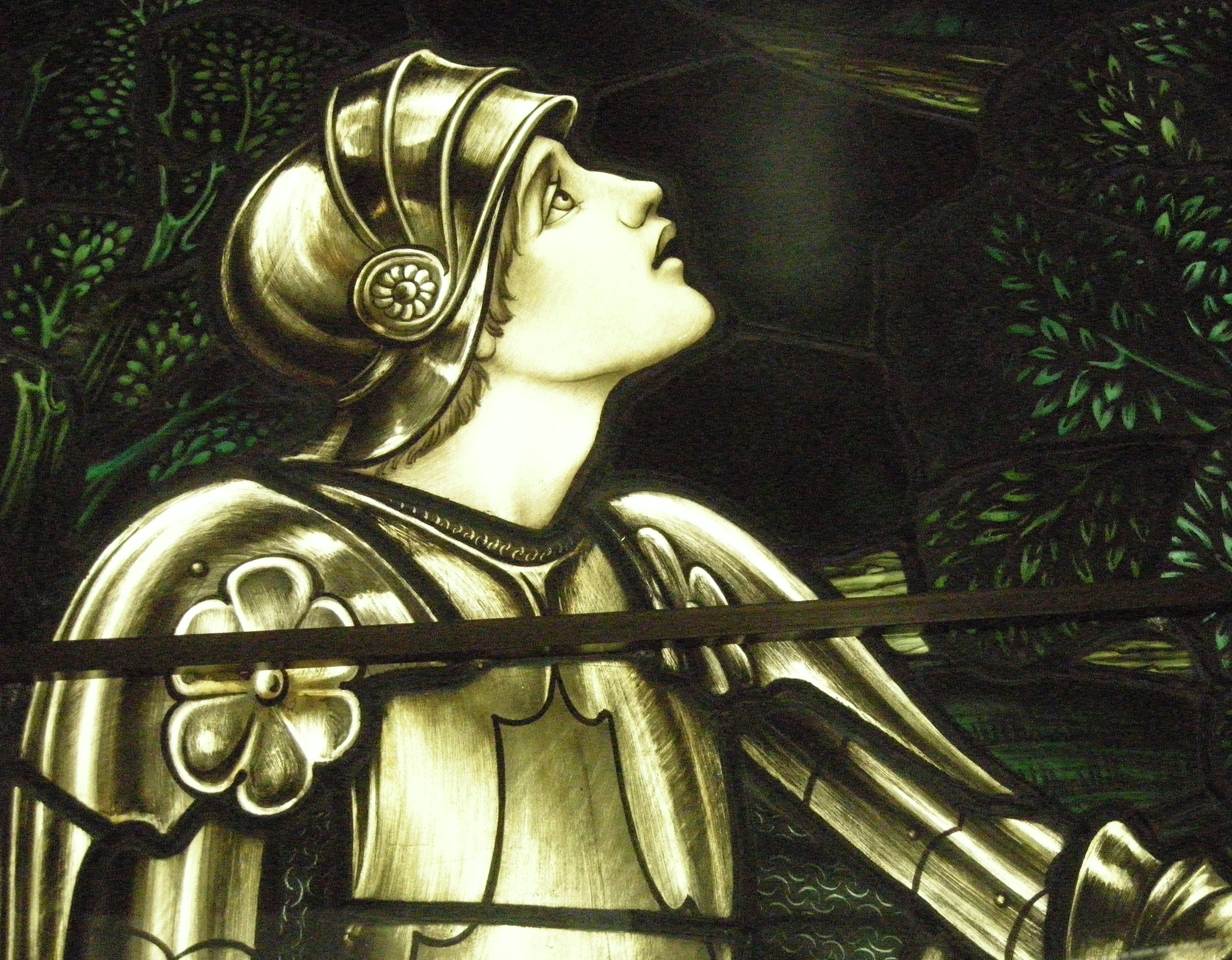
Stained glass by John Henry Dearle for William Morris, 1921

This room contains a small selection of larger exhibits and is often used as a teaching or activity room. Exhibits in the conservatory include a marble statue of the Virgin Mary and Child, that originally belonged to Henry Isaac Butterfield and was returned to the Castle by St Annes Church, Keighley. Recent additions include the a wooden First World War memorial plaque from the Temple Street Methodist Church Keighley which accompanied the Morris memorial windows that are now installed in the Stained Glass gallery. The stained glass gallery contains some of the earliest William Morris stained glass in the country.

=== Keighley Stories gallery ===
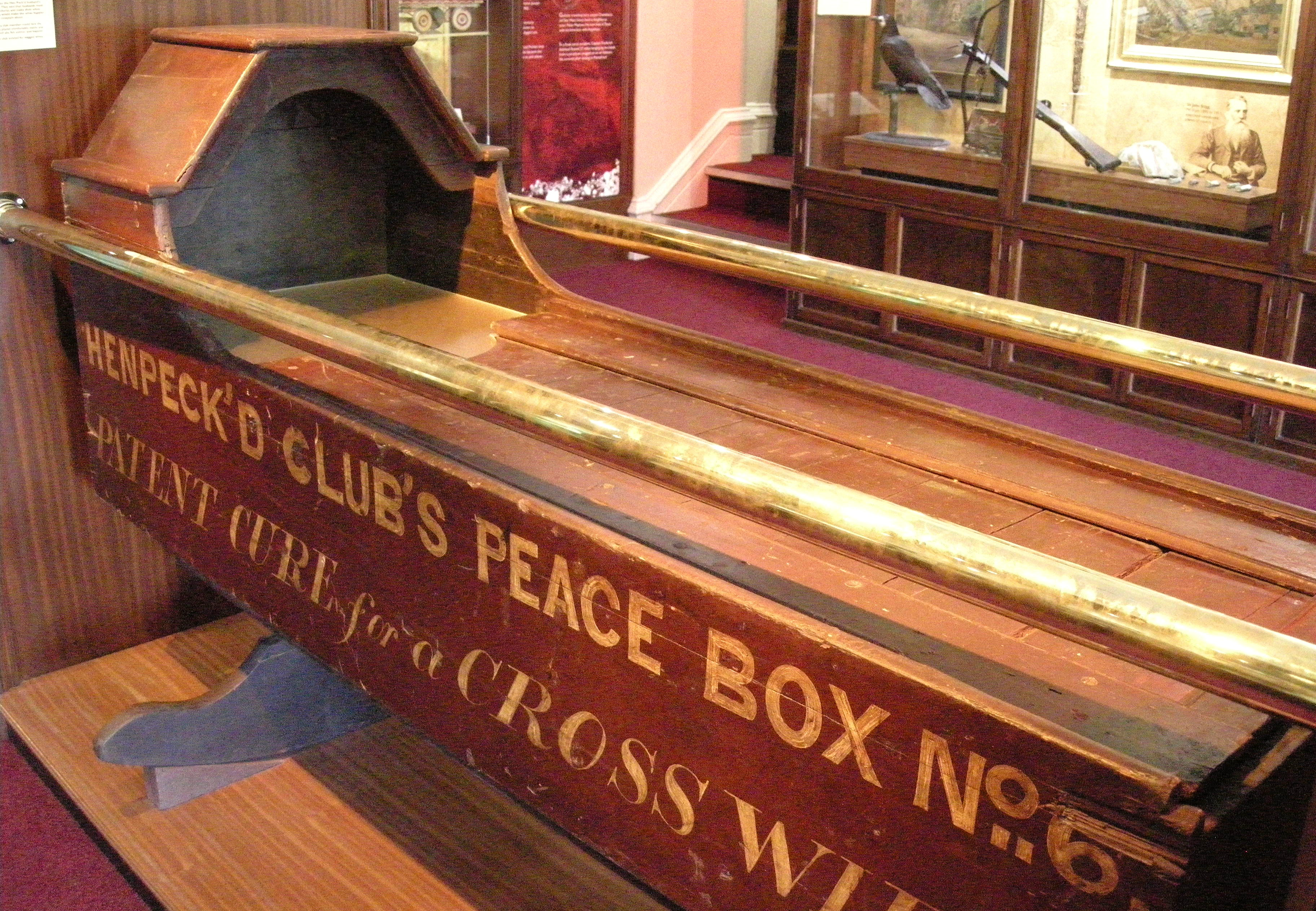
Henpeck'd Club's peace box No.6: an adult-sized 19th-century cradle

This gallery aims to tell the story of Keighley. It includes the Keighley Hen Pecked Club's peace box. This is an adult-sized wooden rocking cradle, supposedly for soothing nagging wives instead of babies. It had humorous rules and was displayed in galas, but it is not known whether it was used. The club used to meet at the Royal Hotel, Damside, and was started by Henry Hargreaves Thompson, who was landlord in 1861. The pub became the Royal Oak in 1998. There is also a Bees Gallery and a Costume Gallery, whose space hosts a changing selection of costume exhibits from the museum's collections.

=== Mansion to Museum gallery, and Local Pottery gallery ===
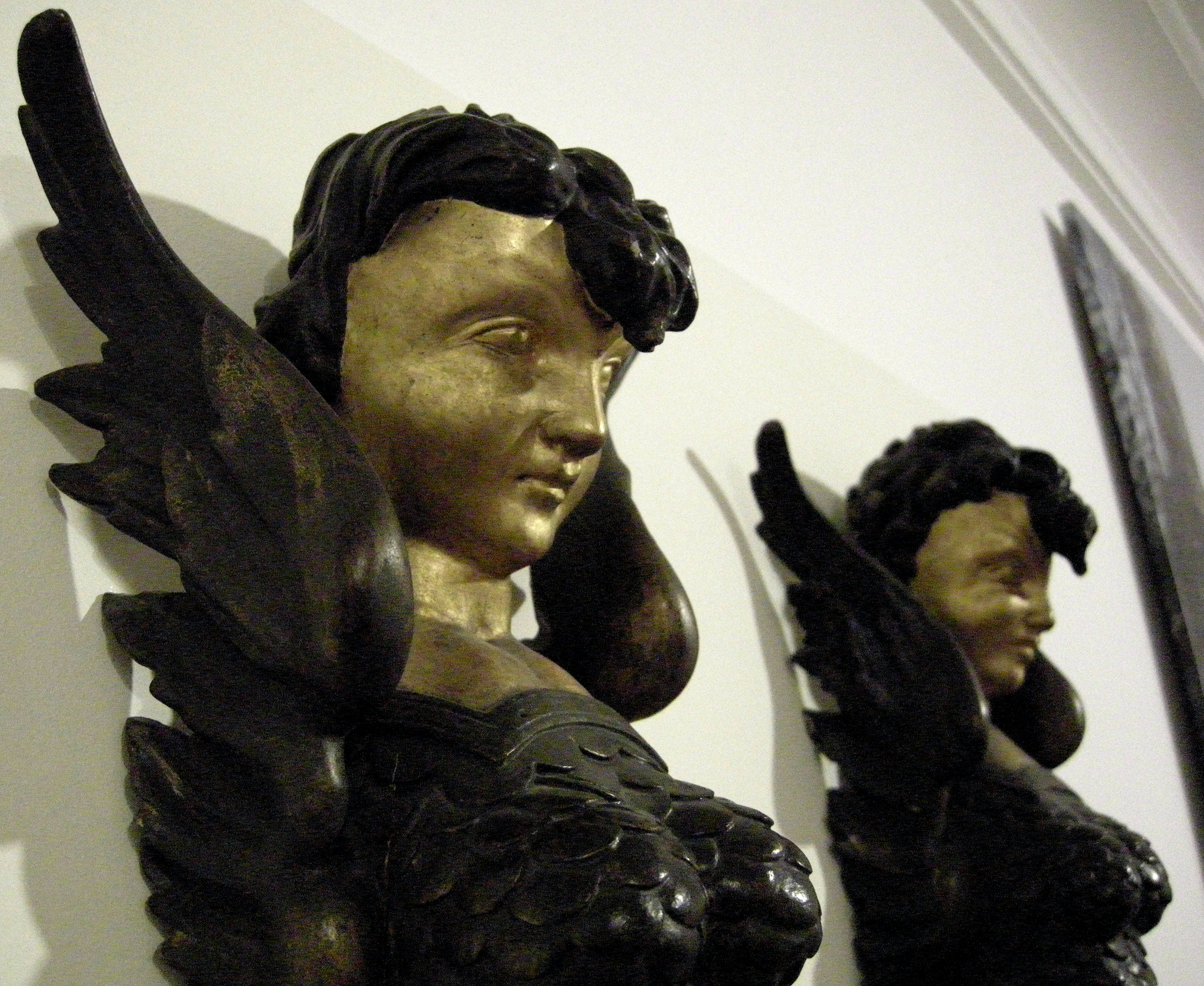
Carved wooden harpies from chandelier

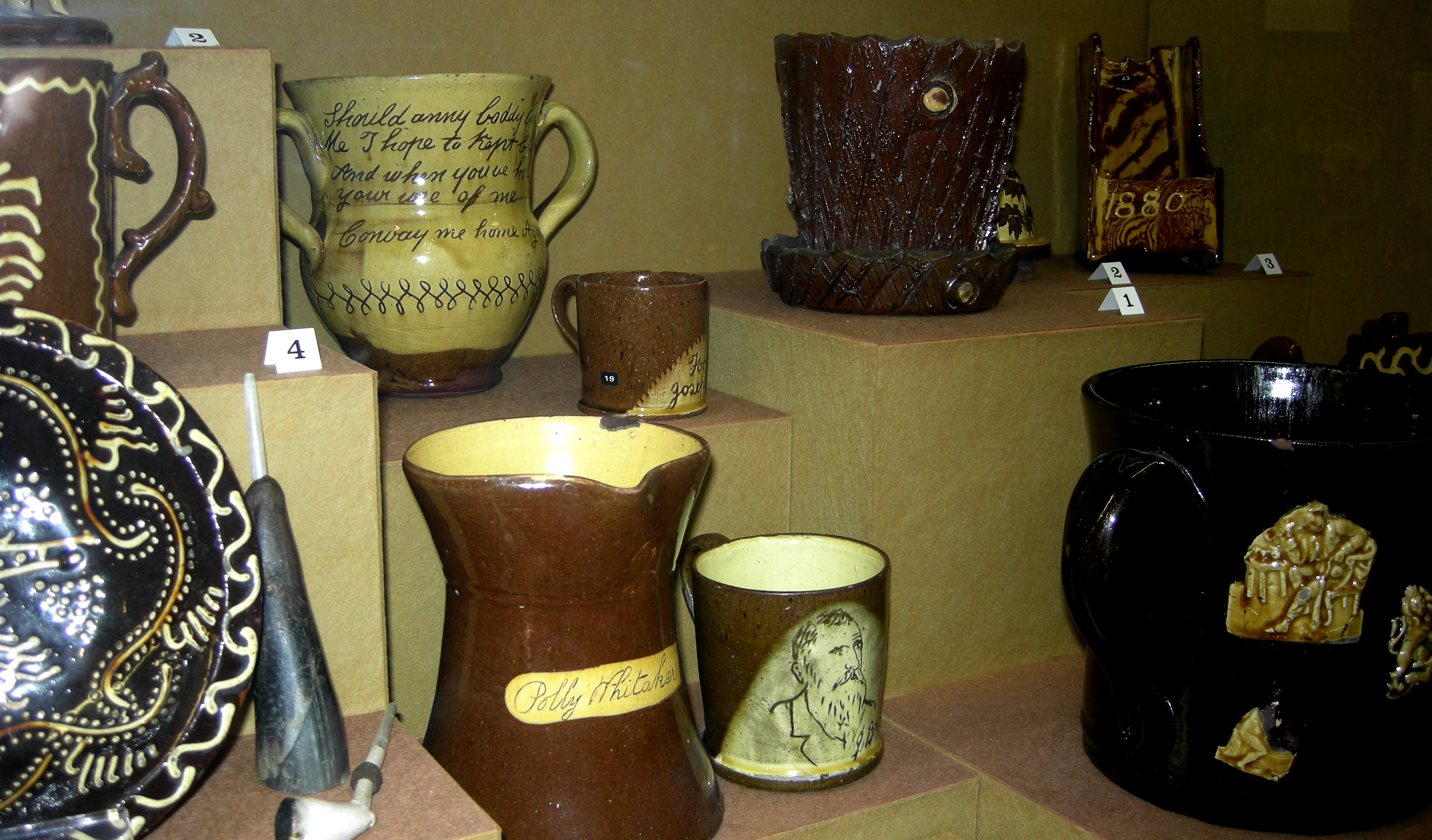
Victorian pottery made in the Keighley area

This gallery, round the top of the octagonal Sir Bracewell Smith Hall, shows the development of the building from a Victorian private house to a contemporary museum. The "Chinese Chandelier", which held wooden harpies, once hung in Cliffe Castle. The chandelier has since been restored (with the harpies) and rehung in the Bracewell Smith Hall. It was designed for the space in the 1950s, although often described as 19th century. The displays in the Local Pottery gallery are placed in recognition of a past local skill, and a trade which was significant in the Keighley area. An alternative tradition to this local industrial tradition was that inspired by Japanese and British Arts & Crafts precedents.

== Other aspects of the museum ==
- The Friends of Cliffe Castle is the society that has researched and supported much of the restoration and improvement of the museum which has taken place in recent years. A leaflet about the society is available at the museum.
- Education programme: School workshops and trails can be booked for Key Stages 1–3, and occasionally for adult and SEN groups.

== See also ==
- Bradford District Museums & Galleries
- History of architecture
- Listed buildings in Keighley
- List of works by George Webster
