= Lysistratus =

4th-century BC Greek sculptor

Lysistratus (Greek: Λυσίστρατος Σικυώνιος; fl. c. 350 BC) was a Greek sculptor of the 4th century BC, brother of Lysippos. According to Pliny the Elder, he followed a strongly realistic line, being the first sculptor to take impressions of human faces in plaster.
