= Boidas =

Sculptor of ancient Greece

Boidas (Ancient Greek: Βοίδας; sometimes transliterated as Bedas) was a sculptor of ancient Greece who lived around the 4th-century BCE, and was likely born in Sicyon.

He was the son and pupil of Lysippos. We still have a bronze attributed to him, depicting a praying youth, the Berlin Adorant, that some scholars believe is a bronze of a copy of Boidas's original. Scholars argue over the extent to which we can take the praying boy to be indicative of Lysippos's style, how much the son would have taken from the father, and whether the bronze we have today is even indicative of Boidas's style versus that of a copyist, but in any case it is unambiguous that the Boidas sculpture is considered characteristic of the best sculpture of the 4th century BCE.

He had two brothers, Euthyktates and Daippos, who were also sculptors.
