= Philip de Jersey =

Archaeologist and expert on Celtic coins

- Born: Guernsey
- Education: Oxford University
- Known for: Study of Celtic coins
- Scientific career
- Fields: Archaeology, Numismatics

Philip de Jersey is a Guernsey archaeologist and numismatist. He is known as an expert on Celtic coins of the Iron Age.

== Life and career ==
De Jersey was born in Guernsey, and studied Geography at Hertford College, University of Oxford. After graduating he stayed on at Oxford University to study for a Doctor of Philosophy (DPhil) on the late Iron Age in north-west France. His doctoral thesis was titled "La Tène and early Gallo-Roman north-west France", and his DPhil was awarded in 1992.

From 1992 to 2008 de Jersey was employed as keeper of the Oxford University Celtic Coin Index, and was responsible for the computerisation of the index. During his time in charge of the Celtic Coin Index the number of coins included on the database increased from about 14,000 to about 40,000.

De Jersey is an Honorary Research Fellow of the Heberden Coin Room at the Ashmolean Museum, and in 1999 was awarded the Council Prize of the British Numismatic Society.

== Works ==
- 2014. Coin Hoards in Iron Age Britain. Spink for The British Numismatic Society. ISBN 9781907427381
- 2006. (ed.) Celtic coinage: new discoveries, new discussion. BAR international series no.1532. Archaeopress. ISBN 9781841719672
- 1997. With Barry Cunliffe. Armorica and Britain: Cross-Channel Relationships in the Late First Millennium BC. Oxford University Committee for Archaeology. ISBN 9780947816452
- 1996. Celtic Coinage in Britain. Shire Archaeology no.72. Shire Books. ISBN 9780747803256
- 1994. Coinage in Iron Age Armorica. Oxford University Committee for Archaeology. ISBN 9780947816391
- 1994. With Robert D. Van Arsdell. The Coinage of the Dobunni: Money Supply and Coin Circulation in Dobunnic Territory. Oxford University Committee for Archaeology. ISBN 9780947816384
- 1992. La Tene and Early Gallo-Roman North-west France. University of Oxford.
