= Lysippos =

4th-century BC Greek sculptor

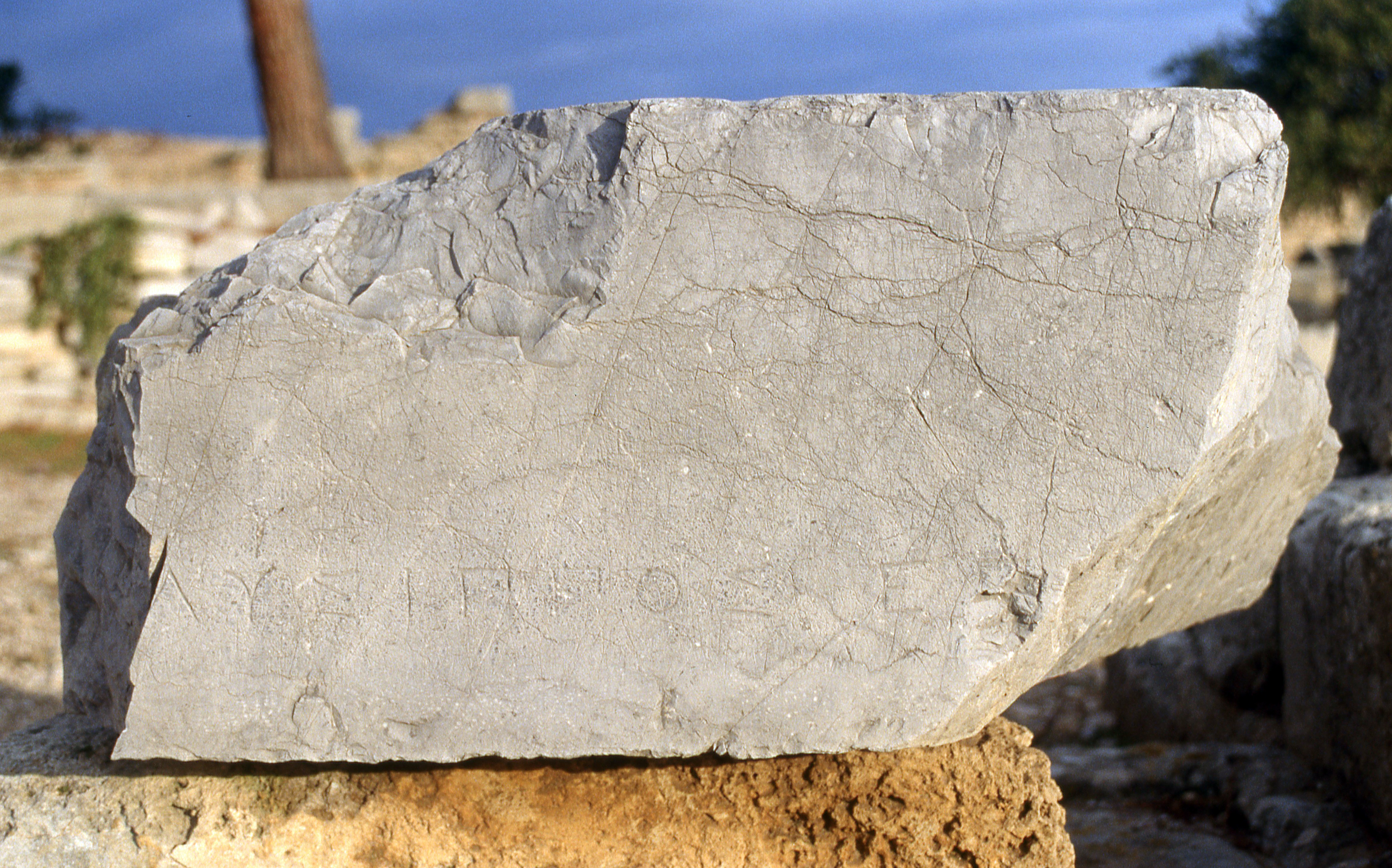
- Statue base at Corinth with signature of Lysippsos, ca. 340 BC
- Born: c. 390 BC; Sicyon, Greece
- Died: c. 300 BC (aged around 90); Sicyon, Greece
- Occupation: sculptor
- Relatives: Lysistratus (brother)

Lysippos (/laɪˈsɪpɒs/; Ancient Greek: Λύσιππος) was a Greek sculptor of the 4th century BC. Together with Scopas and Praxiteles, he is considered one of the three greatest sculptors of the Classical Greek era, bringing transition into the Hellenistic period. The Victorious Youth or Getty bronze, which resurfaced around 1972, has been associated with him.

== Biography ==
Born at Sicyon around 390 BC, Lysippos was a worker in bronze in his youth. He taught himself the art of sculpture, later becoming head of the school of Argos and Sicyon. According to Pliny, he produced more than 1,500 works, all of them in bronze. Commentators noted his grace and elegance, and the symmetria, or coherent balance, of his figures, which were leaner than the ideal represented by Polykleitos and with proportionately smaller heads, giving them the impression of greater height. He was famous for his attention to the details of eyelids and toenails.

His pupil, Chares of Lindos, constructed the Colossus of Rhodes, one of the Seven Wonders of the Ancient World. As this statue does not exist today, debate continues as to whether its sections were cast in bronze or hammered of sheet bronze.

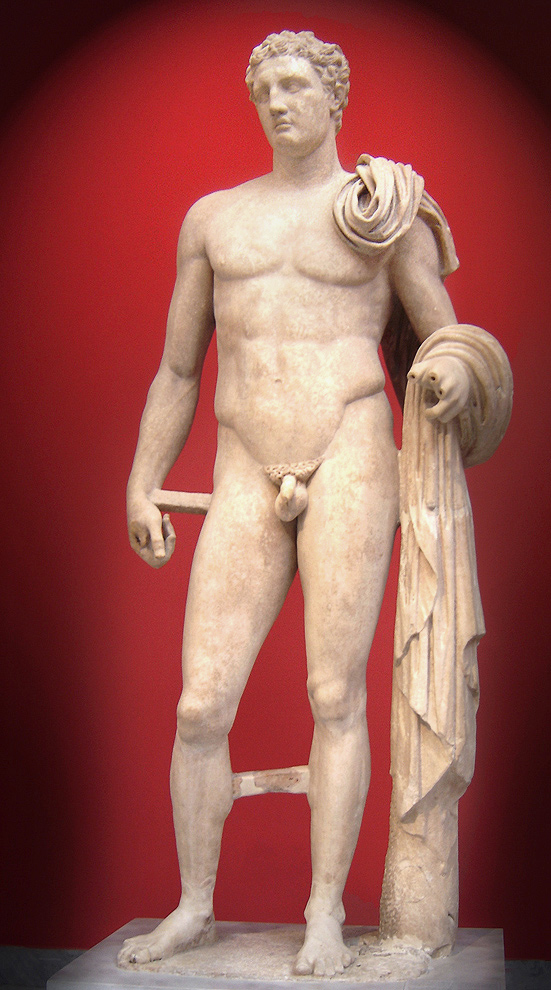
Hermes of Atalante, a Roman marble copy of a lost bronze attributed to Lysippos (National Archaeological Museum of Athens)

He had three sons – Euthyktates, Boidas and Daippos – who were also sculptors and his pupils.

== Career and legacy ==
Lysippos was successor in contemporary repute to the famous sculptor Polykleitos. Among the works attributed to him are the so-called Horses of Saint Mark, Eros Stringing the Bow (of which various copies exist, the best in the British Museum), Agias (known through the marble copy found and preserved in Delphi), the similar Oil Pourer (Dresden and Munich), the Farnese Hercules (which was originally placed in the Baths of Caracalla, although the surviving marble copy lies in the Naples National Archaeological Museum) and Apoxyomenos (or The Scraper, known from a Roman marble copy in the Vatican Museums). Lysippos was also famous for his bronze colossal sculptures of Zeus, 17 metres tall, and Herakles, seven meters seated, both from the city of Taras. The only remaining version of one such statue is a Roman copy of The Weary Herakles (Farnese Hercules), by Glykon, with heavy musculature typical of early third century Rome.

=== Canon of Lysippos ===
Lysippos developed a more gracile style than his predecessor Polykleitos and this has become known as the Canon of Lysippos. In his Historia Naturalis, Pliny the Elder wrote that Lysippos introduced a new canon into art: capita minora faciendo quam antiqui, corpora graciliora siccioraque, per qum proceritas signorum major videretur, (Note: 'he made the heads of his statues smaller than the ancients, and defined the hair especially, making the bodies more slender and sinewy by which the height of the figure seemed greater') signifying "a canon of bodily proportions essentially different from that of Polykleitos". Lysippos is credited with having established the 'eight heads high' canon of body proportions.

== Lysippos and Alexander ==
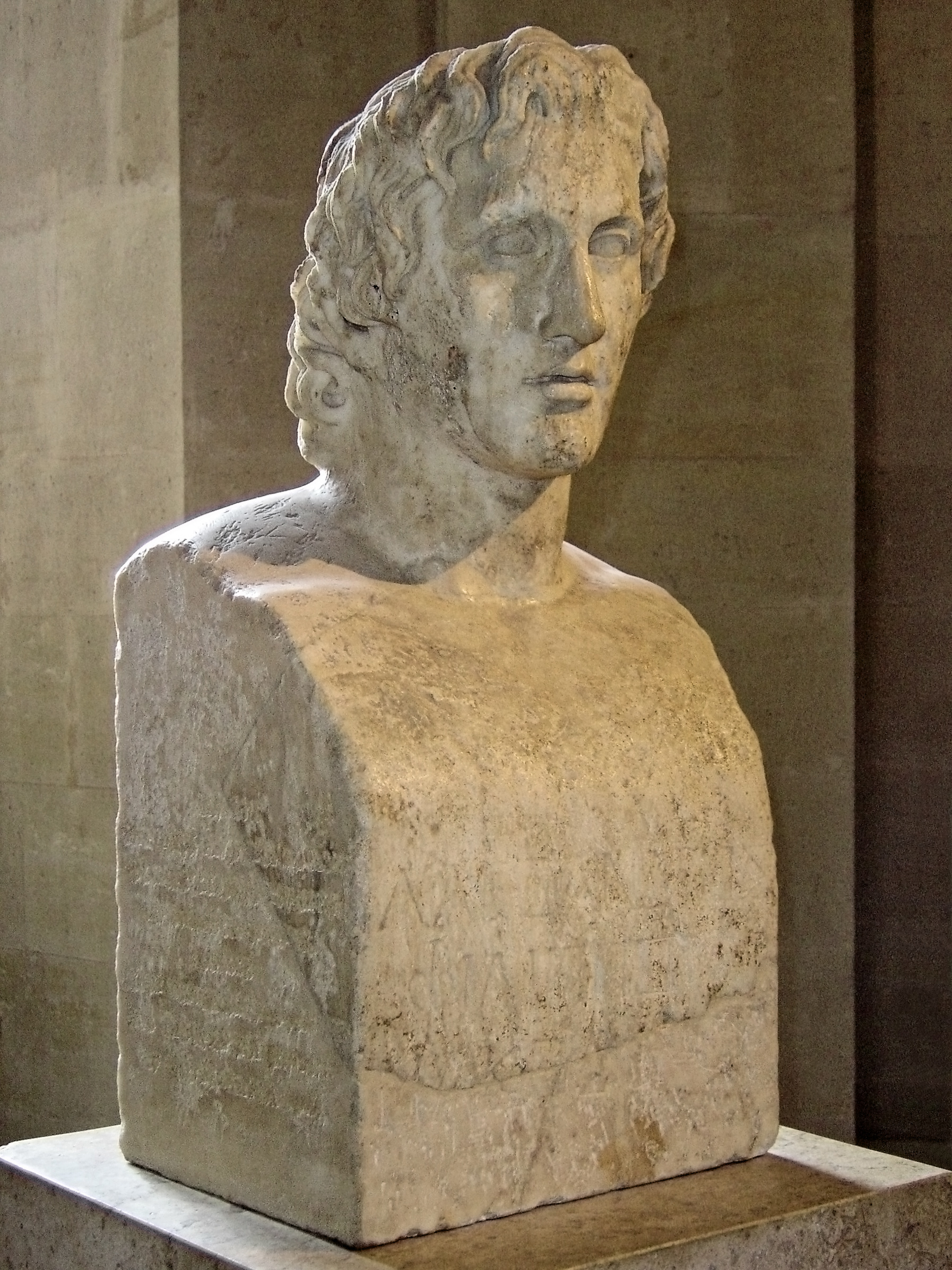
Hermes Azara, a Roman copy of an Alexander bust found at Tivoli, attributed to Lysippos (Louvre)

During his lifetime, Lysippos was personal sculptor to Alexander the Great; indeed, he was the only artist whom the conqueror saw fit to represent him. An epigram by Posidippus, previously only known from the Anthology of Planudes (APl 119), but also found on the recently discovered Milan Papyrus (65 Austin-Bastianini), takes as its inspiration a bronze portrait of Alexander:

Lysippus, sculptor of Sicyon, bold hand,
cunning craftsman, fire is in the glance of the bronze,
which you made in the form of Alexander. In no way can one blame
the Persians: cattle may be forgiven for flying before a lion.

And similarly, an epigram by Asclepiades (APl 120):

Lysippus modelled Alexander's daring and his whole form.
How great is the power of this bronze! The brazen king
seems to be gazing at Zeus and about to say:
"I set Earth under my feet; thyself, Zeus, possess Olympus."

Lysippos has been credited with the stock representation of an inspired, godlike Alexander with tousled hair and lips parted, looking upward in what came to be known as the 'Lysippean gaze'. One fine example, an early Imperial Roman copy found at Tivoli, is conserved at the Louvre.

== The Victorious Youth ==
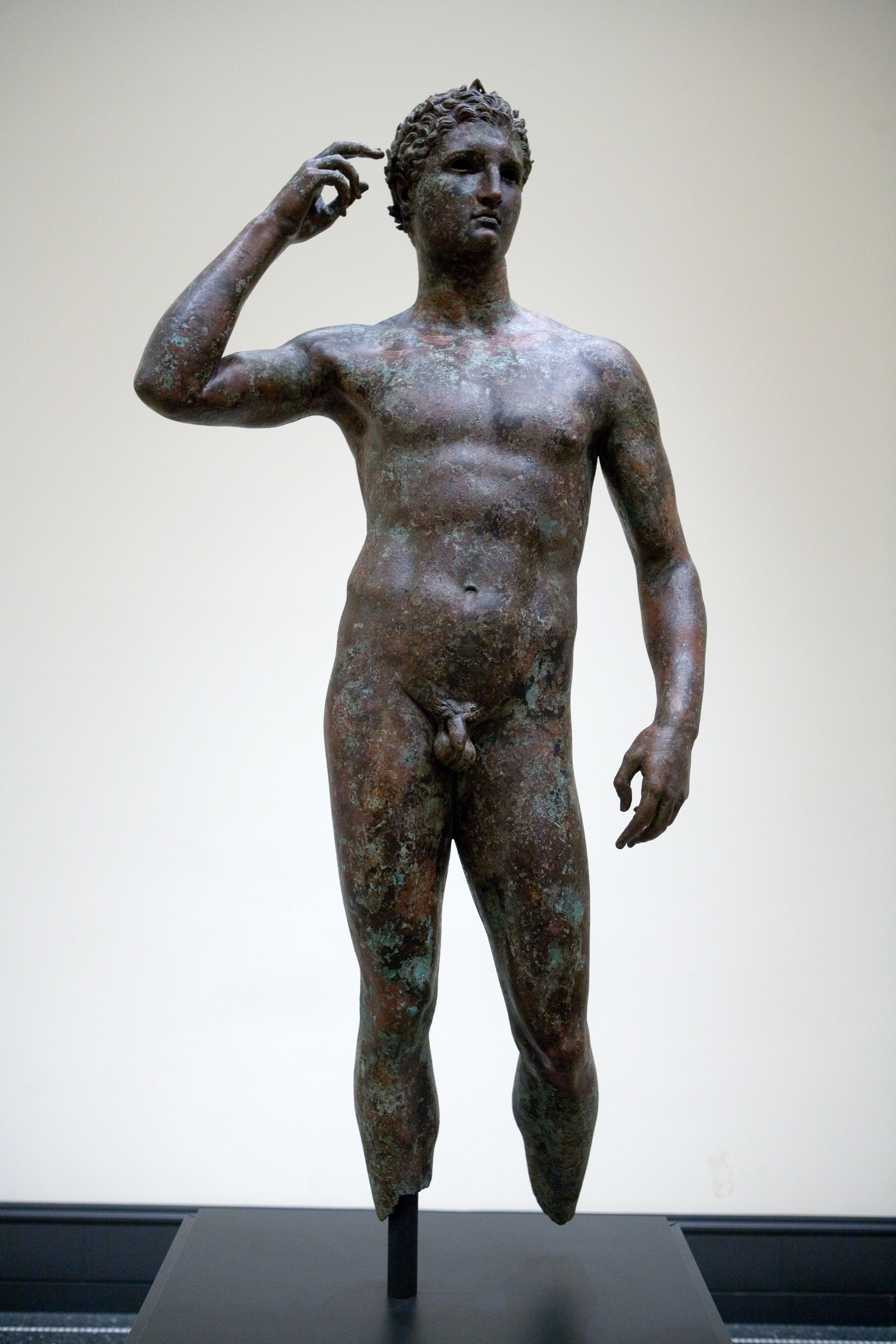
The Getty Victorious Youth

In 1972, the Victorious Youth, Getty Bronze, or Atleta di Fano to Italians, was discovered and at the urging of Paul Getty, bought by the Getty Museum. The bronze was pulled out of the sea and restored. Because of the amount of corrosion and the thick layer of incrustation that coated the statue when it was found, it can be assumed that it was beneath the water for centuries. This is less than surprising, as most of the classical bronze statues archeologists have found have been fished out of the Mediterranean Sea. It was not uncommon for a shipwreck to occur with something as precious as a sculpture on board. Without any way to find or retrieve them, these pieces were left to sit at the bottom of the ocean for centuries. The damaging corrosion can be removed by cleaning the surfaces mechanically with a scalpel.

The Getty Bronze is believed by some to be Lysippos's work, or at least a copy, because the detail on it is consistent with his style of work and his canon of proportions. Lysippos's work is described by ancient sources as naturalistic with slender and often lengthened proportions, often with exaggerated facial features. Those depicted in the works of Lysippos had smaller heads than those of his mentor Polykleitos because he used a one to eight scale for the head and the total height of the body.

== See also ==
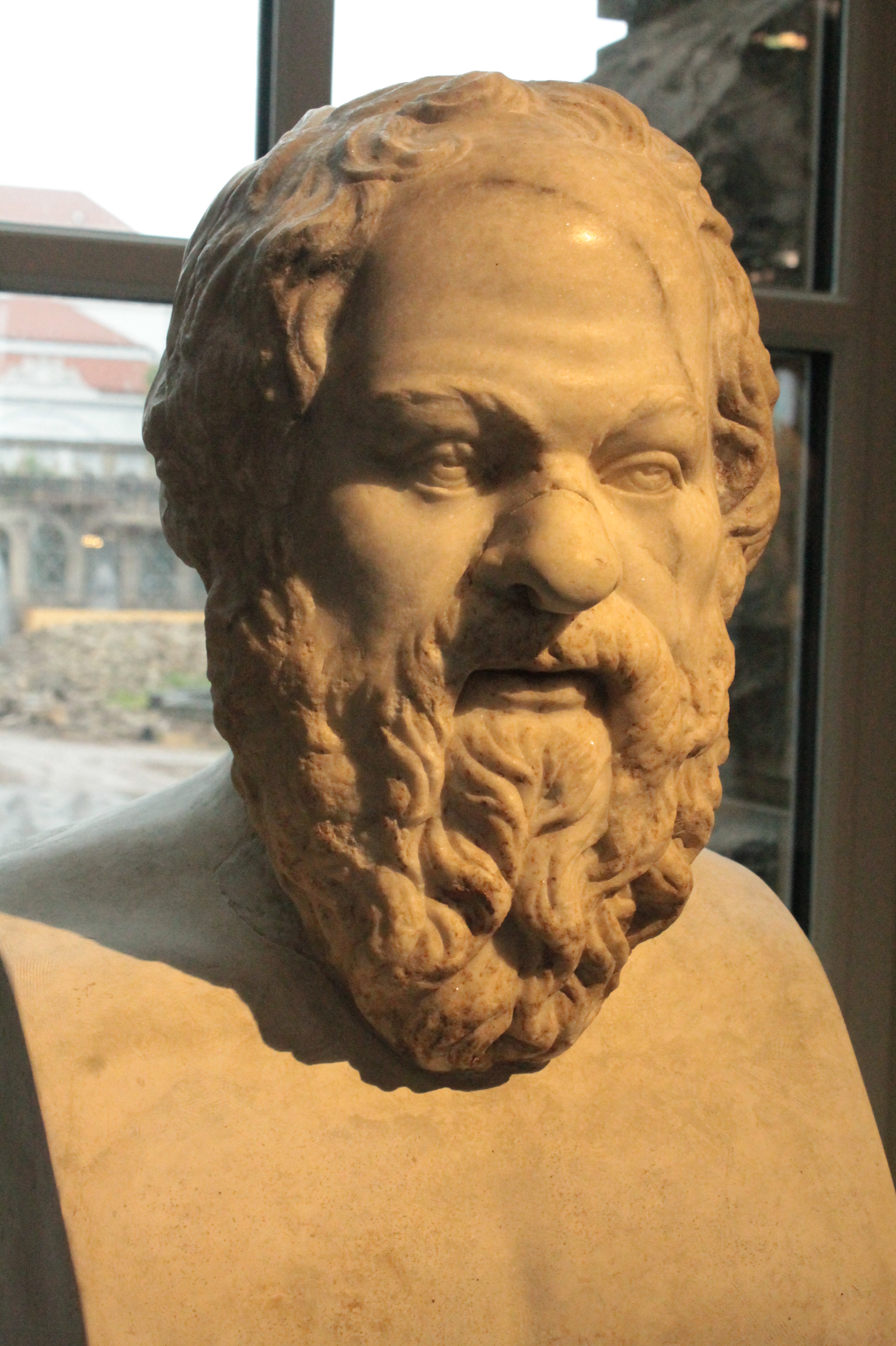
Head of Socrates, 210BC copy of bust by Lysippos of 320BC, Museum of Old Masters, Dresden

- Lysistratus, another Greek sculptor
