= Greco-Persian Wars =

Series of conflicts in the 5th century BC

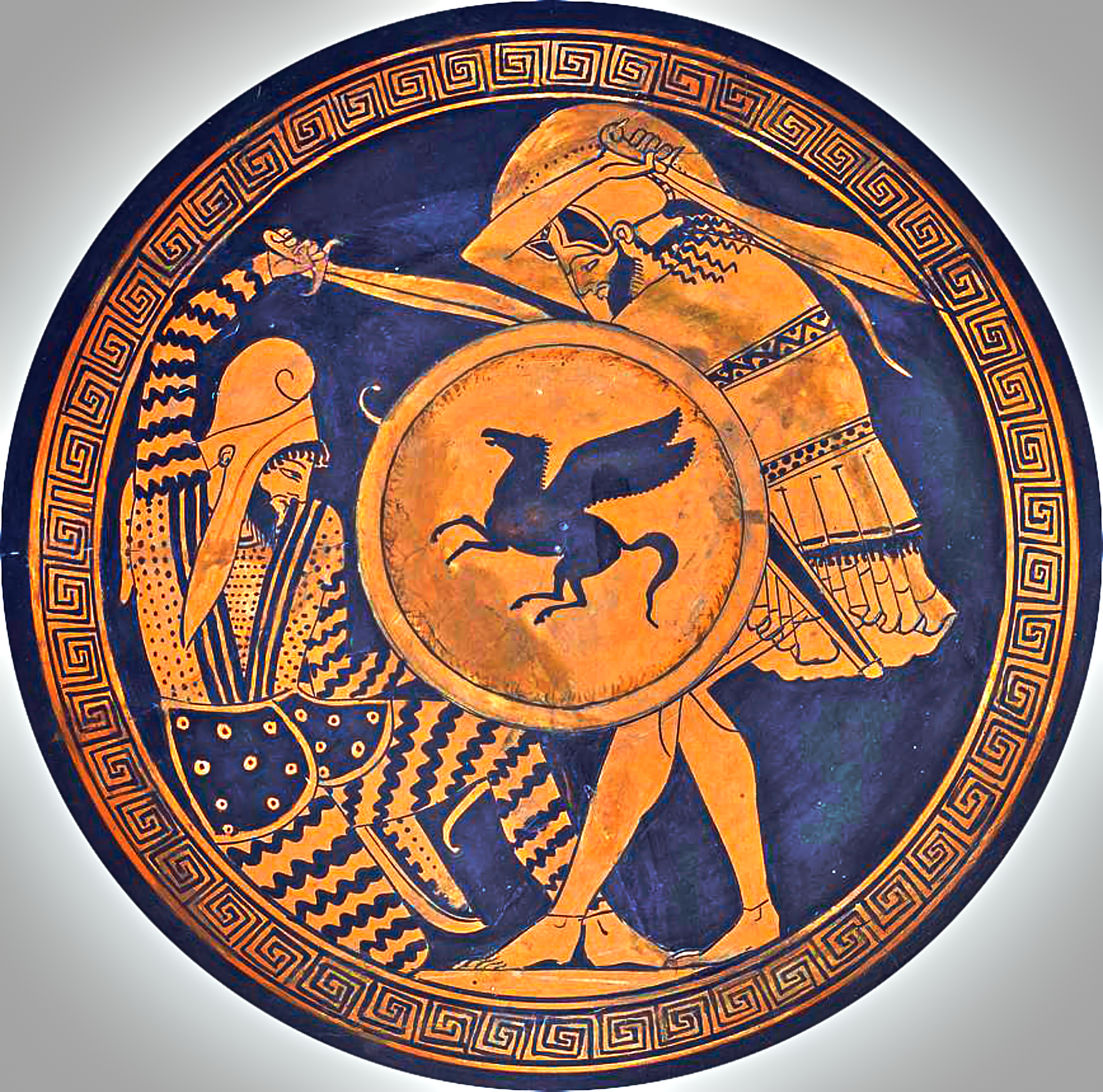
- Combat between a Persian soldier (left) and a Greek hoplite (right) depicted on a kylix displayed at the National Archaeological Museum of Athens
Date	499–449 BC (50 years)
Location	Southeast Europe (Greece, incl. Aegean Islands and Thrace), West Asia (Anatolia and Cyprus), and Northeast Africa (Egypt)
Result	Greek victory
Territorial changes	Withdrawal of the Persian army from Greek-inhabited territory in Europe and Ionia. Withdrawal of the Athenian army from Persian controlled territory's in Egypt and Cyprus. Later withdrawal of Greek forces from western Anatolia.

Belligerents
Greek city-states: • Athens • Sparta • Peloponnesian League • Delian League • Corinth • Plataea • Thebes • Thespiae • Salamis, Cyprus • Ionian rebels Egyptian rebels	Achaemenid Empire Greek vassals: • Halicarnassus • Thessalia • Boeotia • Thebes • Macedon

Commanders and leaders
Miltiades; Leonidas I †; Themistocles; Pausanias; Cimon †; Adeimantus; Ameinias of Athens; Arimnestos; Dionysius the Phocaean; Eurybiades; Leotychides; Xanthippus; Pericles; Charopinos; Hermophantus; Melanthius †; Posidonius †; Stesilaos †; Amompharetus †; Aristagoras †; Aristocyprus †; Callimachus †; Charitimides †; Cynaegirus †; Demophilus †; Eualcides †; Histiaeus †; Onesilus †; Perilaus †; Coes of Mytilene (executed); Leontiades (surrendered)	Darius I Xerxes I Artaxerxes I Artemisia I Ariomardus; Artabazus; Artapanus; Artaphernes; Artaphernes (son of Artaphernes); Artyphius; Datis; Boges; Gongylos; Harpagus; Hippias; Hydarnes II; Masistes; Megabates; Megabazus; Megabyzus; Otanes; Tithraustes; Artayntes; Azanes (son of Arteios); Hyamees; Ithamitres; Peraxes; Artybius †; Daurises †; Mardontes †; Tigranes †; Achaemenes †; Ariabignes †; Damasithymus †; Mardonius †; Masistius †; Pherendatis †; Artayctes (executed); Aridolis (surrendered)

The Greco-Persian Wars, also called the Persian Wars, were a series of armed conflicts involving various Greek city-states and the Achaemenid Empire from 499 BC to 449 BC. The precipitating collision between the fractious political world of ancient Greece and the enormous empire of ancient Persia had begun when the Persian king Cyrus the Great conquered the Greek-inhabited region of Ionia in 547 BC. As they struggled to exert authority over the independent-minded Ionian cities, the Persians appointed Greek tyrants to rule each of them, though this would prove to be the source of much trouble for the Greeks and the Persians alike.

In 499 BC, the Greek tyrant Aristagoras of Miletus embarked on what would ultimately be a failed expedition to conquer Naxos with Persian support. Anticipating his dismissal, Aristagoras incited Greek city-states in Asia Minor to join him in deposing their Persian rulers, sparking the Ionian Revolt. Despite initially lacking support from mainland Greece, Aristagoras secured alliances with Athens and Eretria that helped him capture and raze Sardis in 498 BC. In response to the loss of his regional capital city, the Persian king Darius the Great vowed to exact revenge against the Athenians and the Eretrians. Both sides then effectively stalemated until 495 BC, but in 494 BC, the Persian army consolidated and launched a major assault at the heart of the Ionion Revolt in Miletus; Ionia suffered a decisive defeat in the Battle of Lade, which enabled the collapse of the rebellion over the course of the following year.

Seeking to protect the Achaemenid Empire from being threatened by further uprisings in Asia Minor, Darius embarked on a scheme to conquer the mainland Greeks themselves—both to prevent their political and military interference in Asia Minor and to fulfill his earlier vow to specifically punish Athens and Eretria for their role in the destruction of Sardis. In 492 BC, the first Persian invasion of Greece began under the command of Mardonius, who successfully re-subjugated Thrace and Macedon before several mishaps forced an early end to the rest of the campaign. In 490 BC, another Persian force was sent to Greece—this time across the Aegean Sea—under the command of Datis and Artaphernes, who successfully subjugated the Cyclades before razing Eretria. Before they could reach Athens itself, however, the Persians were defeated by the Athenians and the Plataeans in the Battle of Marathon.

Upon the death of Darius in 486 BC, his son Xerxes I took the throne and the responsibility for continuing the Achaemenid Empire's stalled conquest of Greece. In 480 BC, Xerxes initiated and personally led the second Persian invasion of Greece with one of the largest armies ever assembled in the ancient world. His victory over the Greek alliance in the Battle of Thermopylae allowed the Persian army to raze an evacuated Athens and occupy most of the Greek mainland. Subsequently seeking to destroy the combined Greek fleet, the Persians suffered a severe defeat in the Battle of Salamis. The following year, the confederated Greek forces initiated a joint offensive that decisively routed the Persian army in the Battle of Plataea, which granted independence to Attica and Boeotia.

The Greeks followed up on their success at Plataea by destroying the rest of the Persian fleet in the Battle of Mycale before expelling Persian garrisons from Sestos in 479 BC and from Byzantium in 478 BC. These consecutive losses would force Persian troops to eventually withdraw from Europe, allowing Macedonia and the Ionian city-states to again assert their independence. Tensions between Sparta and other Greek city-states, especially amidst the suspicion that the Spartan general Pausanias had conspired with Xerxes as well as due to Sparta's lack of interest in aiding the Greeks of Asia Minor, prompted the anti-Persian alliance to fall to Athenian hegemony under the Delian League. For the next three decades, the Wars of the Delian League focused on removing the Persian army from Greek territory in both Asia Minor and Cyprus. In 466 BC, the League achieved a double victory in the Battle of the Eurymedon, which completely liberated Ionia. By 460 BC, the Athenians led the League to militarily intervene in support of the Egyptian pharaoh Inaros II, who was rebelling against Artaxerxes I (the king since his father's assassination in 465 BC). Although the Greek–Egyptian alliance saw initial tactical success, the Persian army was able to secure a strategic advantage from Memphis and inflicted a disastrous defeat on the League, which was forced to suspend any further campaigns against the Achaemenid Empire, while Inaros was captured and executed by crucifixion in Susa. A Greek fleet was sent to Cyprus in 451 BC, but achieved little, drawing the Greco-Persian Wars to a quiet end shortly thereafter. Some contemporary and later Greek and Roman sources suggest that the conflict was formally resolved when Athens and the Achaemenid Empire signed the purported Peace of Callias.

== Sources ==
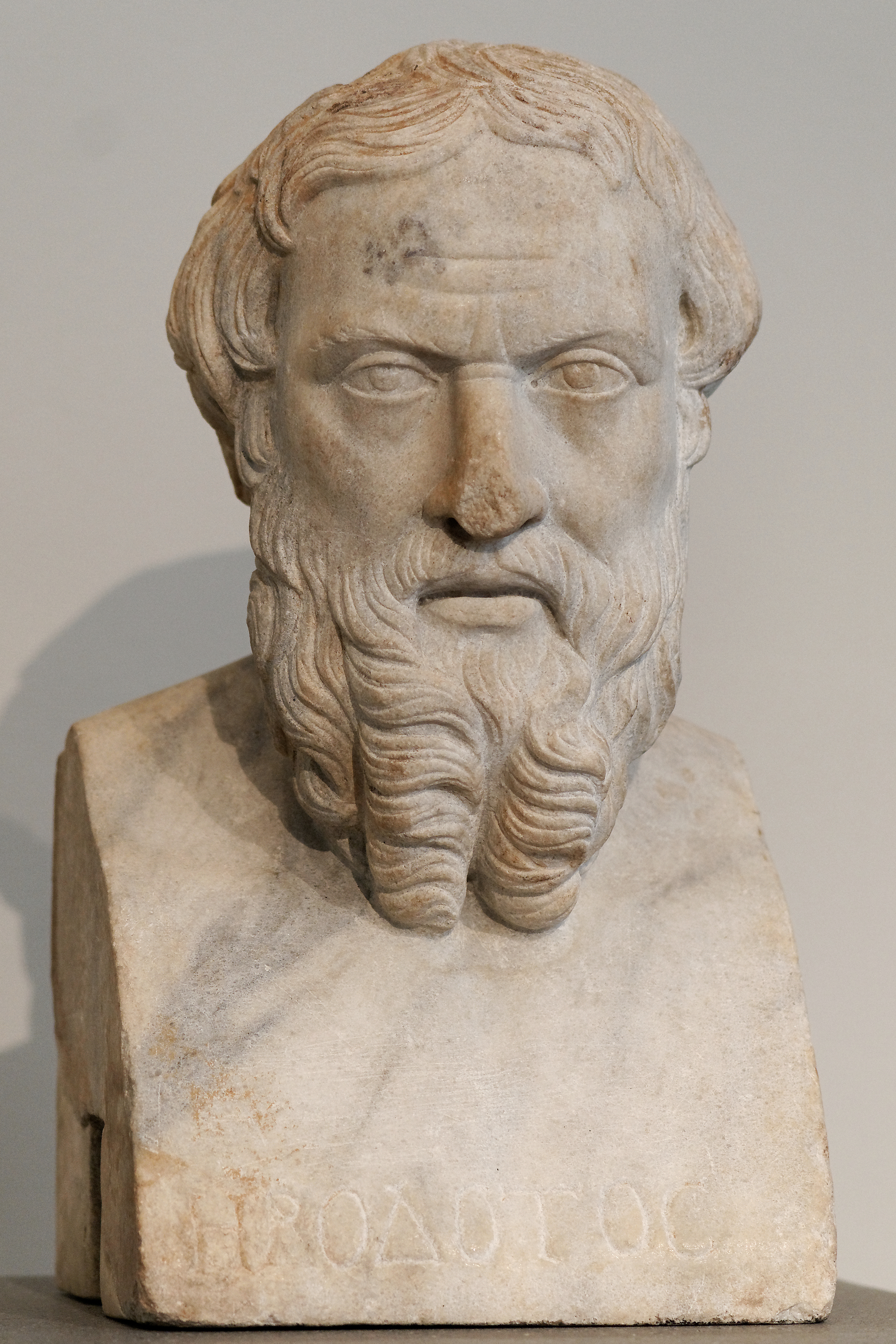
Herodotus, the main historical source for this conflict

All the surviving primary sources for the Greco-Persian Wars are Greek; no contemporary accounts survive in other languages. By far the most important source is the fifth-century Greek historian Herodotus. Herodotus, who has been called the "Father of History", was born in 484 BC in Halicarnassus, Asia Minor (then part of the Persian empire). He wrote his 'Enquiries' (Greek Historia, English (The) Histories) around 440–430 BC, trying to trace the origins of the Greco-Persian Wars, which would still have been recent history. Herodotus's approach was novel and, at least in Western society, he invented 'history' as a discipline. As historian Tom Holland has it, "For the first time, a chronicler set himself to trace the origins of a conflict not to a past so remote so as to be utterly fabulous, nor to the whims and wishes of some god, nor to a people's claim to manifest destiny, but rather explanations he could verify personally."

Some later ancient historians, starting with Thucydides, criticized Herodotus and his methods. Nevertheless, Thucydides chose to begin his history where Herodotus left off (at the siege of Sestos) and felt Herodotus's history was accurate enough not to need re-writing or correcting. Plutarch criticised Herodotus in his essay "On The Malignity of Herodotus", describing Herodotus as "Philobarbaros" (barbarian-lover) for not being pro-Greek enough, which suggests that Herodotus might actually have done a reasonable job of being even-handed. A negative view of Herodotus was passed on to Renaissance Europe, though he remained widely read. However, since the 19th century, his reputation has been dramatically rehabilitated by archaeological finds that have repeatedly confirmed his version of events. The prevailing modern view is that Herodotus did a remarkable job in his Historia, but that some of his specific details (particularly troop numbers and dates) should be viewed with skepticism. Nevertheless, there are still some historians who believe Herodotus made up much of his story.

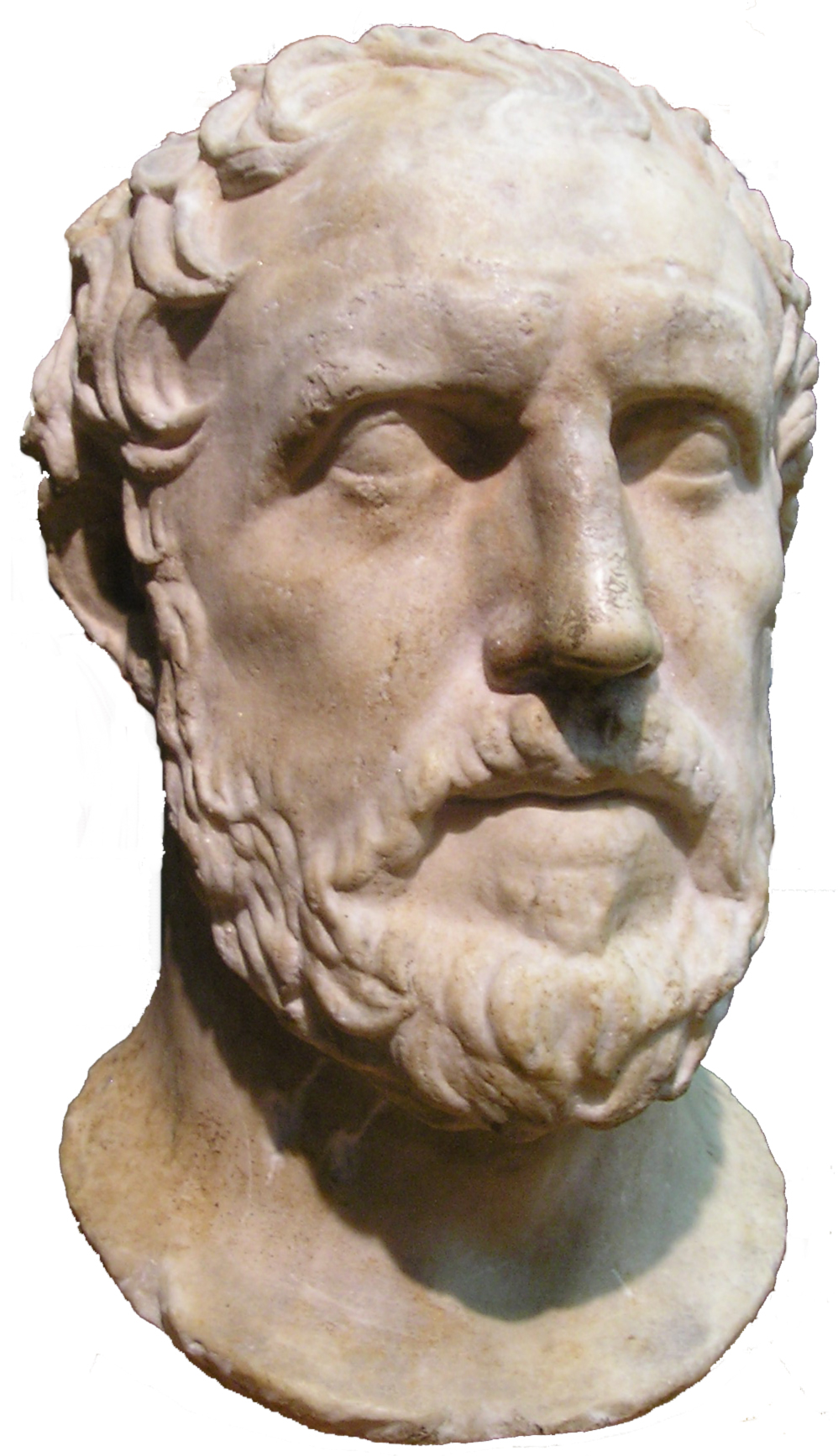
Thucydides continued Herodotus's narrative

The military history of Greece between the end of the second Persian invasion of Greece and the Peloponnesian War (479–431 BC) is not well supported by surviving ancient sources. This period, sometimes referred to as the pentekontaetia (πεντηκονταετία, the Fifty Years) by ancient writers, was a period of relative peace and prosperity within Greece. The richest source for the period, and also the most contemporaneous, is Thucydides' History of the Peloponnesian War, which is generally considered by modern historians to be a reliable primary account. Thucydides only mentions this period in a digression on the growth of Athenian power in the run up to the Peloponnesian War, and the account is brief, probably selective and lacks any dates. Nevertheless, Thucydides's account can be, and is, used by historians to draw up a skeleton chronology for the period, on to which details from archaeological records and other writers can be superimposed.

More detail for the whole period is provided by Plutarch, in his biographies of Themistocles, Aristides and especially Cimon. Plutarch was writing some 600 years after the events in question, and is therefore a secondary source, but he often names his sources, which allows some degree of verification of his statements. In his biographies, he draws directly from multiple ancient histories that have not survived, and thus often preserves details of the period that are omitted in Herodotus and Thucydides's accounts. The final major existing source for the period is the universal history (Bibliotheca historica) of the 1st century BC Sicilian, Diodorus Siculus. Much of Diodorus's writing about this period is drawn from the much earlier Greek historian Ephorus, who also wrote a universal history. Diodorus is also a secondary source and often derided by modern historians for his style and inaccuracies, but he preserves multiple details of the ancient period found nowhere else.

Further scattered details can be found in Pausanias's Description of Greece, while the Byzantine Suda dictionary of the 10th century AD preserves some anecdotes found nowhere else. Minor sources for the period include the works of Pompeius Trogus (epitomized by Justinus), Cornelius Nepos and Ctesias of Cnidus (epitomized by Photius), which are not in their original textual form. These works are not considered reliable (especially Ctesias), and are not particularly useful for reconstructing the history of this period.

A few physical remnants of the conflict have been found by archaeologists. The most famous is the Serpent Column in Istanbul, which was originally placed at Delphi to commemorate the Greek victory at Plataea. In 1939, Greek archaeologist Spyridon Marinatos found the remains of numerous Persian arrowheads at the Kolonos Hill on the field of Thermopylae, which is now generally identified as the site of the defender's last stand.

== Origins of the conflict ==
The Greeks of the classical period believed that, in the dark age that followed the collapse of the Mycenaean civilization, significant numbers of Greeks fled and had emigrated to Asia Minor and settled there. Modern historians generally accept this migration as historic (but separate from the later colonization of the Mediterranean by the Greeks). There are, however, those who believe the Ionian migration cannot be explained as simply as the classical Greeks claimed. These settlers were from three tribal groups: the Aeolians, Dorians and Ionians. The Ionians had settled about the coasts of Lydia and Caria, founding the twelve cities that made up Ionia. These cities were Miletus, Myus and Priene in Caria; Ephesus, Colophon, Lebedos, Teos, Clazomenae, Phocaea and Erythrae in Lydia; and the islands of Samos and Chios. Although the Ionian cities were independent of one another, they recognized their shared heritage and supposedly had a common temple and meeting place, the Panionion. They thus formed a 'cultural league', to which they would admit no other cities, or even other tribal Ionians.

The cities of Ionia remained independent until they were conquered by the Lydians of western Asia Minor. The Lydian king Alyattes attacked Miletus, a conflict that ended with a treaty of alliance between Miletus and Lydia, that meant that Miletus would have internal autonomy but follow Lydia in foreign affairs. At this time, the Lydians were also in conflict with the Median Empire, and the Milesians sent an army to aid the Lydians in this conflict. Eventually a peaceable settlement was established between the Medes and the Lydians, with the Halys River set up as the border between the kingdoms. The famous Lydian king Croesus succeeded his father Alyattes in around 560 BC and set about conquering the other Greek city states of Asia Minor.

The Persian prince Cyrus led a rebellion against the last Median king Astyages in 553 BC. Cyrus was a grandson of Astyages and was supported by part of the Median aristocracy. By 550 BC, the rebellion was over, and Cyrus had emerged victorious, founding the Achaemenid Empire in place of the Median kingdom in the process. Croesus saw the disruption in the Median Empire and Persia as an opportunity to extend his realm and asked the oracle of Delphi whether he should attack them. The Oracle supposedly replied the famously ambiguous answer that "if Croesus was to cross the Halys he would destroy a great empire". Blind to the ambiguity of this prophecy, Croesus attacked the Persians, but was eventually defeated and Lydia fell to Cyrus.

The Achaemenid Empire at its greatest extent under Darius the Great

While fighting the Lydians, Cyrus had sent messages to the Ionians asking them to revolt against Lydian rule, which the Ionians had refused to do. After Cyrus finished the conquest of Lydia, the Ionian cities now offered to be his subjects under the same terms as they had been subjects of Croesus. Cyrus refused, citing the Ionians' unwillingness to help him previously. The Ionians thus prepared to defend themselves, and Cyrus sent the Median general Harpagus to conquer them. He first attacked Phocaea; the Phocaeans decided to abandon their city entirely and sail into exile in Sicily, rather than become Persian subjects (although a number of them later returned). Some Teians also chose to emigrate when Harpagus attacked Teos, but the rest of the Ionians remained, and were each in turn conquered.

In the years following their conquest, the Persians found the Ionians difficult to rule. Elsewhere in the empire, Cyrus identified elite native groups such as the priesthood of Judea – to help him rule his new subjects. No such group existed in Greek cities at this time; while there was usually an aristocracy, this was inevitably divided into feuding factions. The Persians thus settled for sponsoring a tyrant in each Ionian city, even though this drew them into the Ionians' internal conflicts. Furthermore, certain tyrants might develop an independent streak and have to be replaced. The tyrants themselves faced a difficult task; they had to deflect the worst of their fellow citizens' hatred, while staying in the favour of the Persians. In the past, Greek states had often been ruled by tyrants, but that form of government was on the decline. Past tyrants had also tended and needed to be strong and able leaders, whereas the rulers appointed by the Persians were simply place-men. Backed by Persian military might, these tyrants did not need the support of the population, and could thus rule absolutely. On the eve of the Greco-Persian wars, it is probable that the Ionian population had become discontented and was ready for rebellion.

=== Warfare in the ancient Mediterranean ===
In the Greco-Persian wars both sides made use of spear-armed infantry and light missile troops. Greek armies placed the emphasis on heavier infantry, while Persian armies favoured lighter troop types.

==== Persia ====
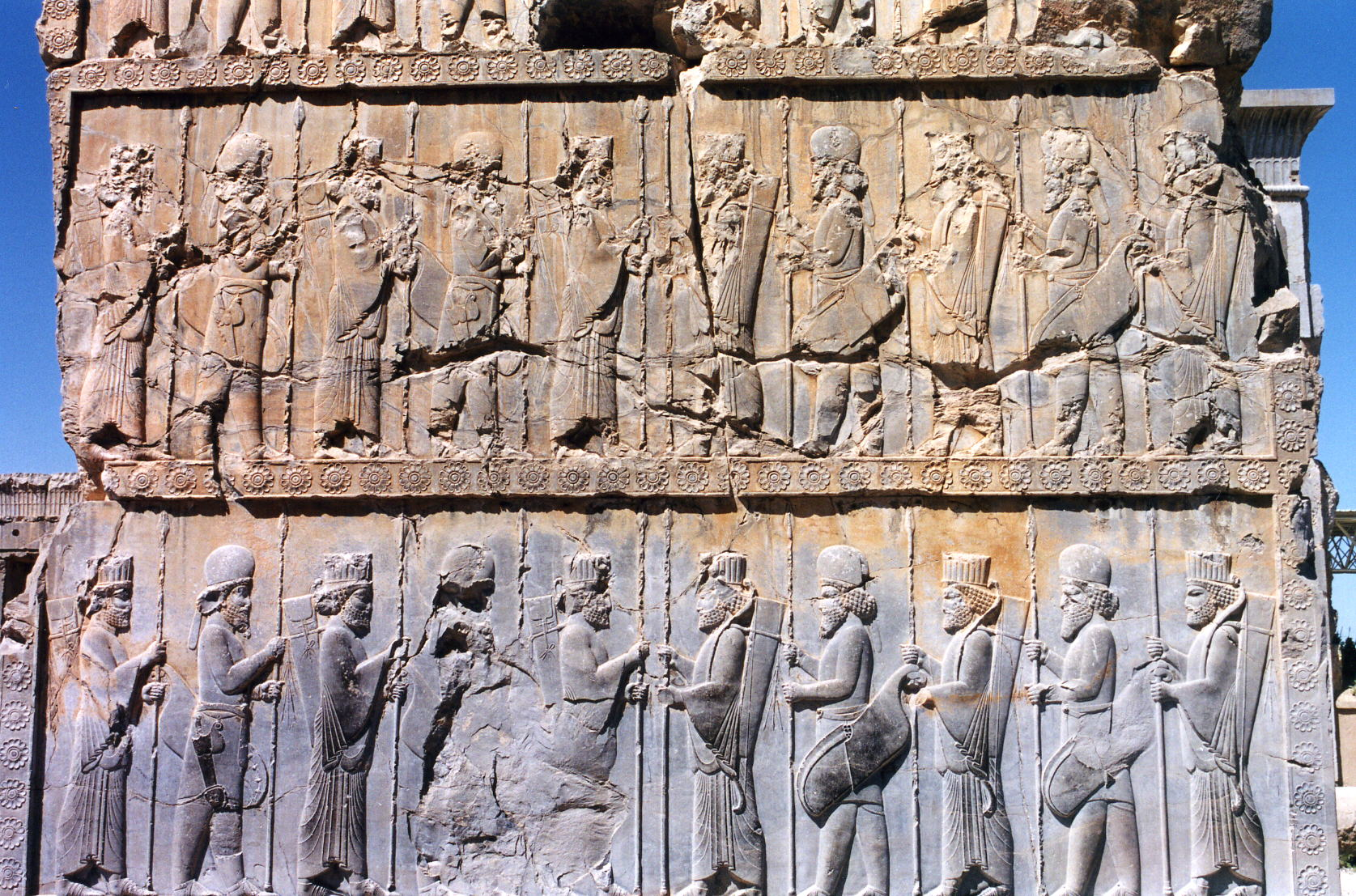
Persian and Median Immortals in ceremonial dress, bas-relief in Persepolis

The Persian military consisted of a diverse group of men drawn across the various nations of the empire. However, according to Herodotus, there was at least a general conformity in armor and style of fighting. The troops were usually armed with a bow, a 'short spear' and a sword or axe, and carried a wicker shield. They wore a leather jerkin, although individuals of high status wore high-quality metal armor. The Persians most likely used their bows to wear down the enemy, then closed in to deliver the final blow with spears and swords. The first rank of Persian infantry formations, the so-called 'sparabara', had no bows, carried larger wicker shields and were sometimes armed with longer spears. Their role was to protect the back ranks of the formation. The cavalry probably fought as lightly armed missile cavalry.

==== Greece ====
The style of warfare between the Greek city-states, which dates back until at least 650 BC (as dated by the 'Chigi vase'), was based around the hoplite phalanx supported by missile troops. The 'hoplites' were foot soldiers usually drawn from the members of the middle-classes (in Athens called the zeugites), who could afford the equipment necessary to fight in this manner. The heavy armour (the hoplon) usually included a breastplate or a linothorax, greaves, a helmet, and a large round, concave shield (the aspis) . Hoplites were armed with long spears (the dory), which were significantly longer than Persian spears, and a sword (the xiphos). The heavy armour and longer spears made them superior in hand-to-hand combat and gave them significant protection against ranged attacks. Lightly armed skirmishers, the psiloi also comprised a part of Greek armies growing in importance during the conflict; at the Battle of Plataea, for instance, they may have formed over half the Greek army. Use of cavalry in Greek armies is not reported in the battles of the Greco-Persian Wars.

==== Naval warfare ====
At the beginning of the conflict, all naval forces in the eastern Mediterranean had switched to the trireme, a warship powered by three banks of oars. The most common naval tactics during the period were ramming (Greek triremes were equipped with a cast-bronze ram at the bows), or boarding by ship-borne marines. More experienced naval powers had by this time also begun to use a manoeuver known as diekplous. It is not clear what this was, but it probably involved sailing into gaps between enemy ships and then ramming them in the side.

The Persian naval forces were primarily provided by the seafaring people of the empire: Phoenicians, Egyptians, Cilicians and Cypriots. Other coastal regions of the Persian Empire would contribute ships throughout the course of the wars.

== Preliminary contacts between Persia and mainland Greece (507 BC) ==
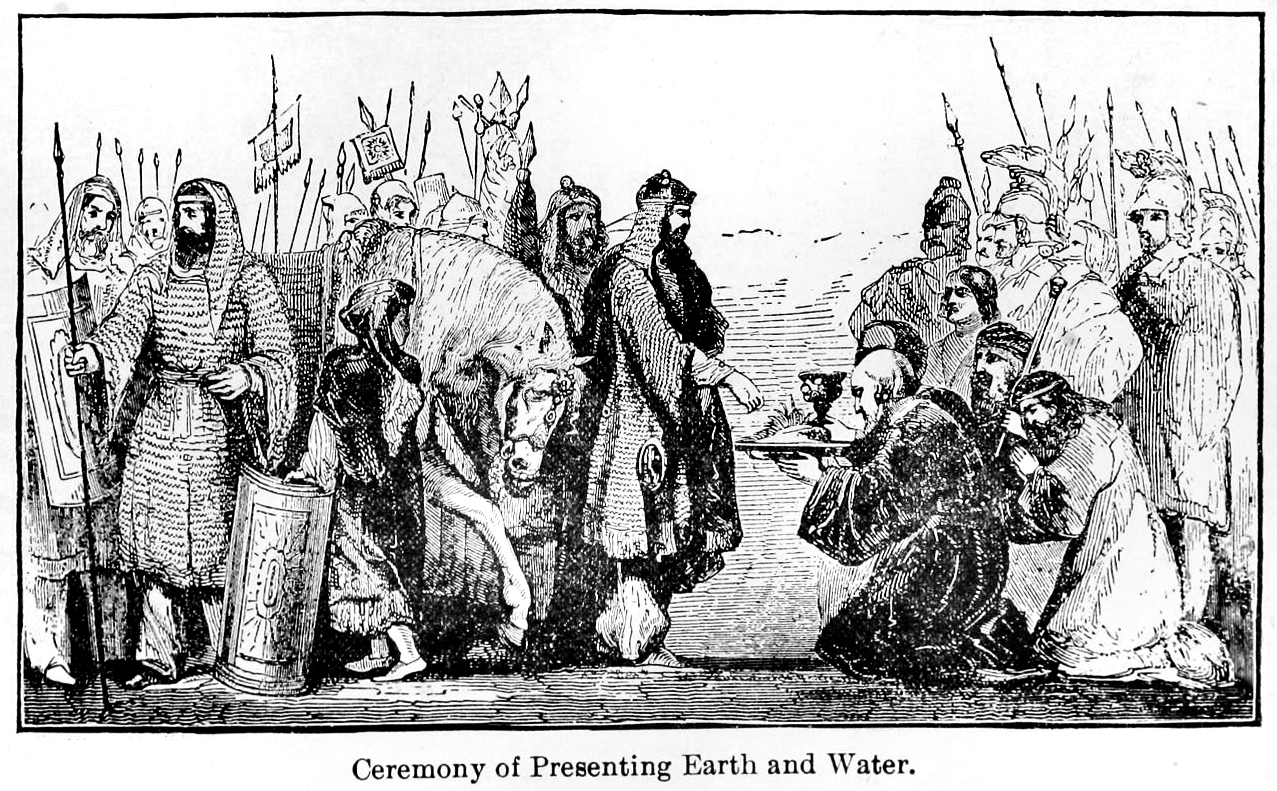
According to Herodotus, the Athenians, hoping for protection against Sparta, made the gift of "Earth and Water" to the Persians in 507 BC.

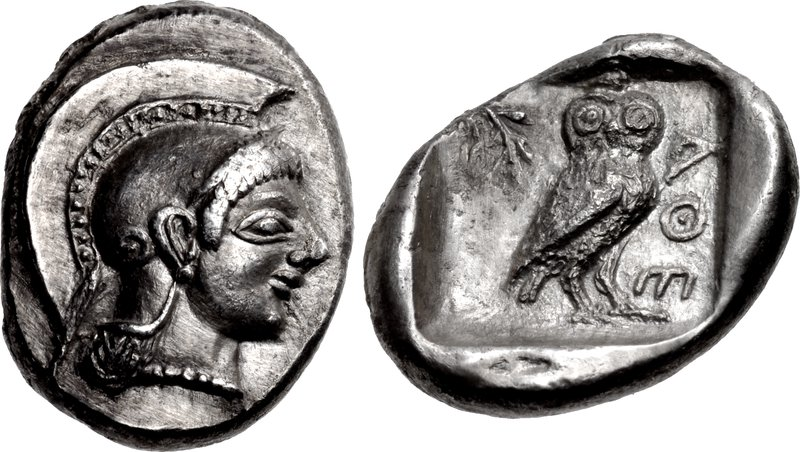
Coinage of Athens at the time of Cleisthenes. Effigy of Athena, with owl and ΑΘΕ, initials of "Athens". c. 510–500/490 BC.

In 507 BC, Artaphernes, as brother of Darius I and Satrap of Asia Minor in his capital Sardis, received an embassy from newly democratic Athens, probably sent by Cleisthenes, which was looking for Persian assistance to resist the threats from Sparta. Herodotus reports that Artaphernes had no previous knowledge of the Athenians, and his initial reaction was "Who are these people?". Artaphernes asked the Athenians for "Water and Earth", a symbol of submission, if they wanted help from the Achaemenid king. The Athenians ambassadors apparently accepted to comply, and to give "Earth and Water". Artaphernes also advised the Athenians that they should receive back the Athenian tyrant Hippias. The Persians threatened to attack Athens if they did not accept Hippias. Nevertheless, the Athenians preferred to remain democratic despite the danger from Persia, and the ambassadors were disavowed and censured upon their return to Athens.

The Athenians dispatched envoys to Sardis, desiring to make an alliance with the Persians; for they knew that they had provoked the Lacedaemonians and Cleomenes to war. When the envoys came to Sardis and spoke as they had been bidden, Artaphrenes son of Hystaspes, viceroy of Sardis, asked them, "What men are you, and where dwell you, who desire alliance with the Persians?" Being informed by the envoys, he gave them an answer whereof the substance was, that if the Athenians gave king Darius earth and water, then he would make alliance with them; but if not, his command was that they should begone. The envoys consulted together and consented to give what was asked, in their desire to make the alliance. So they returned to their own country, and were then greatly blamed for what they had done.

— Herodotus 5.73.

There is a possibility that the Achaemenid ruler now saw the Athenians as subjects who had solemnly promised submission through the gift of "Earth and Water", and that subsequent actions by the Athenians, such as their intervention in the Ionian revolt, were perceived as a break of oath, and a rebellion to the central authority of the Achaemenid ruler.

== Ionian Revolt (499–493 BC) ==
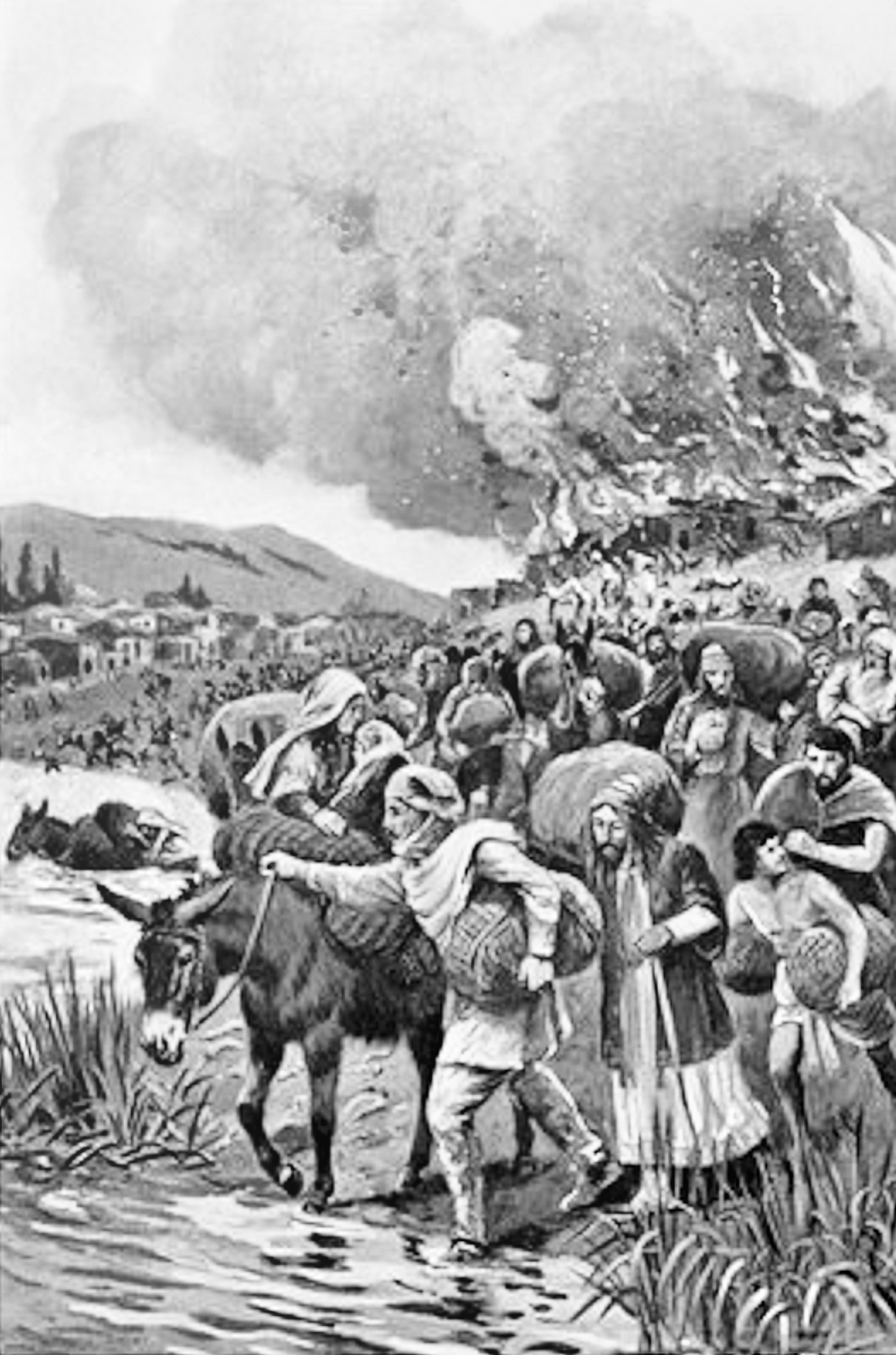
The burning of Sardis by the Greeks and the Ionians during the Ionian Revolt in 498 BC.

The Ionian Revolt and associated revolts in Aeolis, Doris, Cyprus, and Caria were military rebellions by several regions of Asia Minor against Persian rule, lasting from 499 to 493 BC. At the heart of the rebellion was the dissatisfaction of the Greek cities of Asia Minor with the tyrants appointed by Persia to rule them, along with opposition to the individual actions of two Milesian tyrants, Histiaeus and Aristagoras. In 499 BC the then tyrant of Miletus, Aristagoras, launched a joint expedition with the Persian satrap Artaphernes to conquer Naxos, in an attempt to bolster his position in Miletus (both financially and in terms of prestige). The mission was a debacle, and sensing his imminent removal as tyrant, Aristagoras chose to incite the whole of Ionia into rebellion against the Persian king Darius the Great.

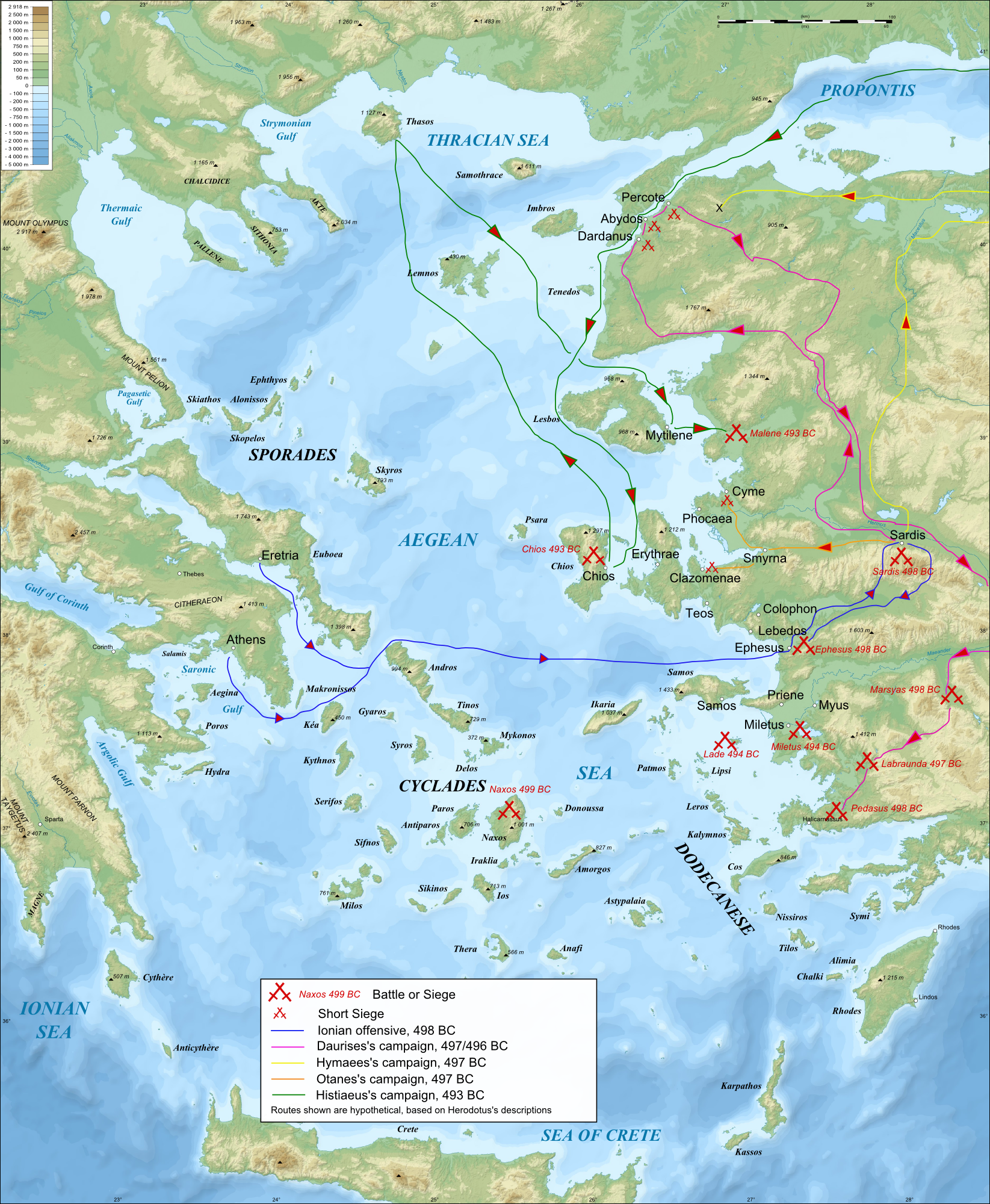
Map showing main events of the Ionian Revolt.

Struggling to rule the independent-minded cities of Ionia, the Persians appointed local tyrants to rule each of them. This would prove to be the source of much trouble for the Greeks and Persians alike. In 498 BC, supported by troops from Athens and Eretria, the Ionians marched on, captured, and burnt Sardis. However, on their return journey to Ionia, they were followed by Persian troops, and decisively beaten at the Battle of Ephesus. This campaign was the only offensive action taken by the Ionians, who subsequently went on the defensive. The Persians responded in 497 BC with a three-pronged attack aimed at recapturing the outlying areas of the rebellious territory, but the spread of the revolt to Caria meant the largest army, under Darius, moved there instead. While at first campaigning successfully in Caria, this army was wiped out in an ambush at the Battle of Pedasus. This resulted in a stalemate for the rest of 496 and 495 BC.

By 494 BC the Persian army and navy had regrouped, and they made straight for the epicentre of the rebellion at Miletus. The Ionian fleet sought to defend Miletus by sea, but was defeated decisively at the Battle of Lade, after the Samians had defected. Miletus was then besieged and captured. Most of its men were killed, while its women and children were enslaved. This double defeat effectively ended the revolt, and the Carians surrendered to the Persians as a result. The Persians spent 493 BC reducing the cities along the west coast that still held out against them, before finally imposing a peace settlement on Ionia that was considered to be both just and fair.

The Ionian Revolt constituted the first major conflict between Greece and the Achaemenid Empire and represents the first phase of the Greco-Persian Wars. Asia Minor had been brought back into the Persian fold, but Darius had vowed to punish Athens and Eretria for their support for the revolt. Moreover, seeing that the political situation in Greece posed a continued threat to the stability of his Empire, he decided to embark on the conquest of all Greece.

== First invasion of Greece (492–490 BC) ==
After having reconquered Ionia, the Persians began to plan their next moves of extinguishing the threat to their empire from Greece; and punishing Athens and Eretria. The resultant first Persian invasion of Greece consisted of two main campaigns.

=== 492 BC: Mardonius' campaign ===
Map showing events of the first phases of the Greco-Persian Wars

The first campaign, in 492 BC, was led by Darius's son-in-law Mardonius, who re-subjugated Thrace, which had nominally been part of the Persian empire since 513 BC. Mardonius was also able to force Macedon to become a fully subordinate client kingdom of Persia; it had previously been a vassal, but retained a broad degree of autonomy. However, further progress in this campaign was prevented when Mardonius's fleet was wrecked in a storm off the coast of Mount Athos. Mardonius himself was then injured in a raid on his camp by a Thracian tribe, and after this he returned with the rest of the expedition to Asia.

The following year, having given clear warning of his plans, Darius sent ambassadors to all the cities of Greece, demanding their submission. He received it from almost all of them, except Athens and Sparta, both of whom instead executed the ambassadors. With Athens still defiant, and Sparta now also effectively at war with him, Darius ordered a further military campaign for the following year.

=== 490 BC: Datis and Artaphernes' campaign ===
In 490 BC, Datis and Artaphernes (son of the satrap Artaphernes) were given command of an amphibious invasion force, and set sail from Cilicia. The Persian force sailed first to the island of Rhodes, where a Lindian Temple Chronicle records that Datis besieged the city of Lindos, but was unsuccessful. The fleet sailed next to Naxos, to punish the Naxians for their resistance to the failed expedition the Persians had mounted there a decade earlier. A number of the inhabitants fled to the mountains; those that the Persians caught were enslaved. The Persians then burnt the city and temples of the Naxians. The fleet then proceeded to island-hop across the rest of the Aegean on its way to Eretria, taking hostages and troops from each island.

The task force sailed on to Euboea, and to the first major target, Eretria. The Eretrians made no attempt to stop the Persians from landing or advancing and thus allowed themselves to be besieged. For six days, the Persians attacked the walls, with losses on both sides; however, on the seventh day two reputable Eretrians opened the gates and betrayed the city to the Persians. The city was razed, and temples and shrines were looted and burned. Furthermore, according to Darius's commands, the Persians enslaved all the remaining townspeople.

==== Battle of Marathon ====
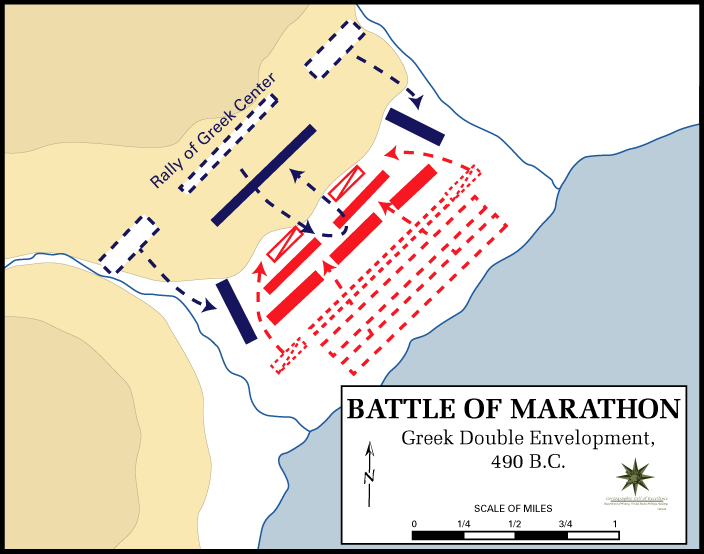
The Greek wings envelop the Persians

The Persian fleet next headed south down the coast of Attica, landing at the bay of Marathon, roughly 40 kilometres (25 mi) from Athens. Under the guidance of Miltiades, the general with the greatest experience of fighting the Persians, the Athenian army marched to block the two exits from the plain of Marathon. Stalemate ensued for five days, before the Persians decided to continue onward to Athens, and began to load their troops back onto the ships. After the Persians had loaded their cavalry (their strongest soldiers) on the ships, the 10,000 Athenian soldiers descended from the hills around the plain. The Greeks crushed the weaker Persian foot soldiers by routing the wings before turning towards the centre of the Persian line. The remnants of the Persian army fled to their ships and left the battle. Herodotus records that 6,400 Persian bodies were counted on the battlefield; the Athenians lost only 192 men.

As soon as the Persian survivors had put to sea, the Athenians marched as quickly as possible to Athens. They arrived in time to prevent Artaphernes from securing a landing in Athens. Seeing his opportunity lost, Artaphernes ended the year's campaign and returned to Asia.

The Battle of Marathon was a watershed in the Greco-Persian wars, showing the Greeks that the Persians could be beaten. It also highlighted the superiority of the more heavily armoured Greek hoplites, and showed their potential when used wisely.

== Interbellum (490–480 BC) ==
=== Achaemenid Empire ===
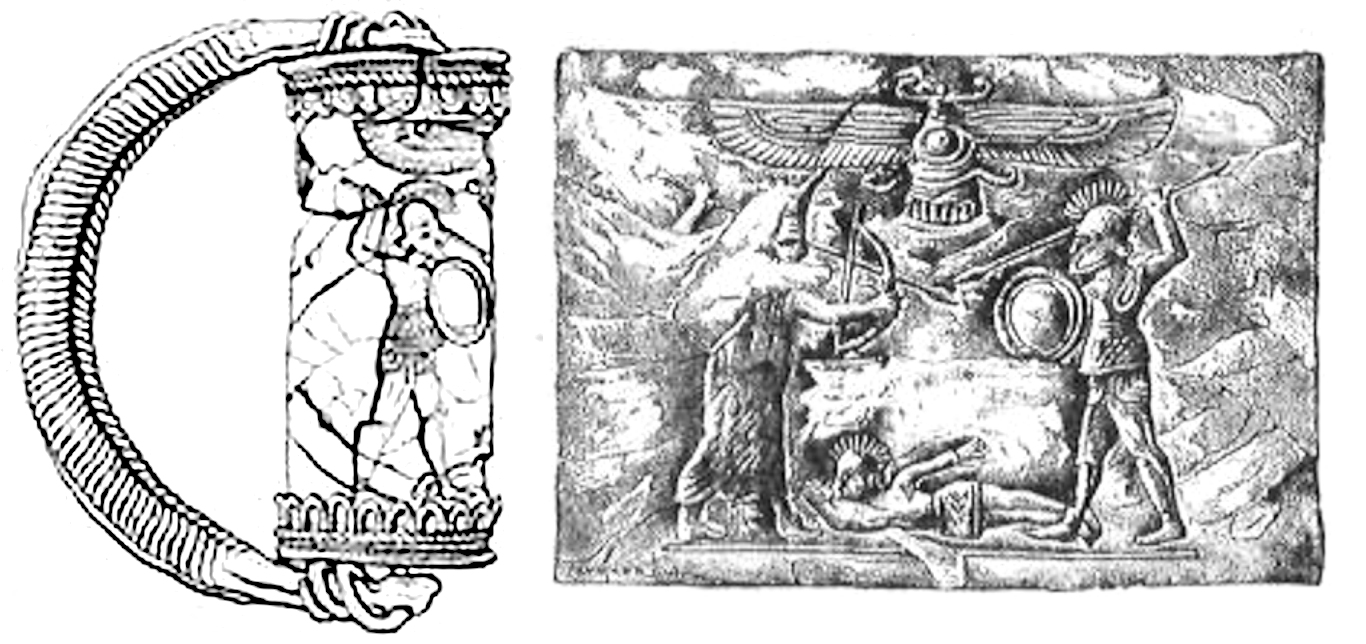
Achaemenid king fighting hoplites, cylinder seal and seal holder, Cimmerian Bosporus.

After the failure of the first invasion, Darius began raising a huge new army with which he intended to subjugate Greece completely. However, in 486 BC, his Egyptian subjects revolted, and the revolt forced an indefinite postponement of any Greek expedition. Darius died while preparing to march on Egypt, and the throne of Persia passed to his son Xerxes I. Xerxes crushed the Egyptian revolt, and quickly resumed the preparations for the invasion of Greece. Since this was to be a full-scale invasion, it needed longterm planning, stockpiling and conscription. Xerxes decided that the Hellespont would be bridged to allow his army to cross to Europe, and that a canal should be dug across the isthmus of Mount Athos (a Persian fleet had been destroyed in 492 BC while rounding this coastline). These were both feats of exceptional ambition that would have been beyond the capabilities of any other contemporary state However, the campaign was delayed by one year because of another revolt in Egypt and Babylonia.

The Persians had the sympathy of several Greek city-states, including Argos, which had pledged to defect when the Persians reached their borders. The Aleuadae family, who ruled Larissa in Thessaly, saw the invasion as an opportunity to extend their power. Thebes, though not explicitly 'Medising', was suspected of being willing to aid the Persians once the invasion force arrived.

In 481 BC, after roughly four years of preparation, Xerxes began to muster the troops to invade Europe. Herodotus gives the names of 46 nations from which troops were drafted. The Persian army was gathered in Asia Minor in the summer and autumn of 481 BC. The armies from the Eastern satrapies were gathered in Kritala, Cappadocia and were led by Xerxes to Sardis where they passed the winter. Early in spring, it moved to Abydos where it was joined with the armies of the western satrapies. Then the army that Xerxes had mustered marched towards Europe, crossing the Hellespont on two pontoon bridges.

==== Size of the Persian forces ====
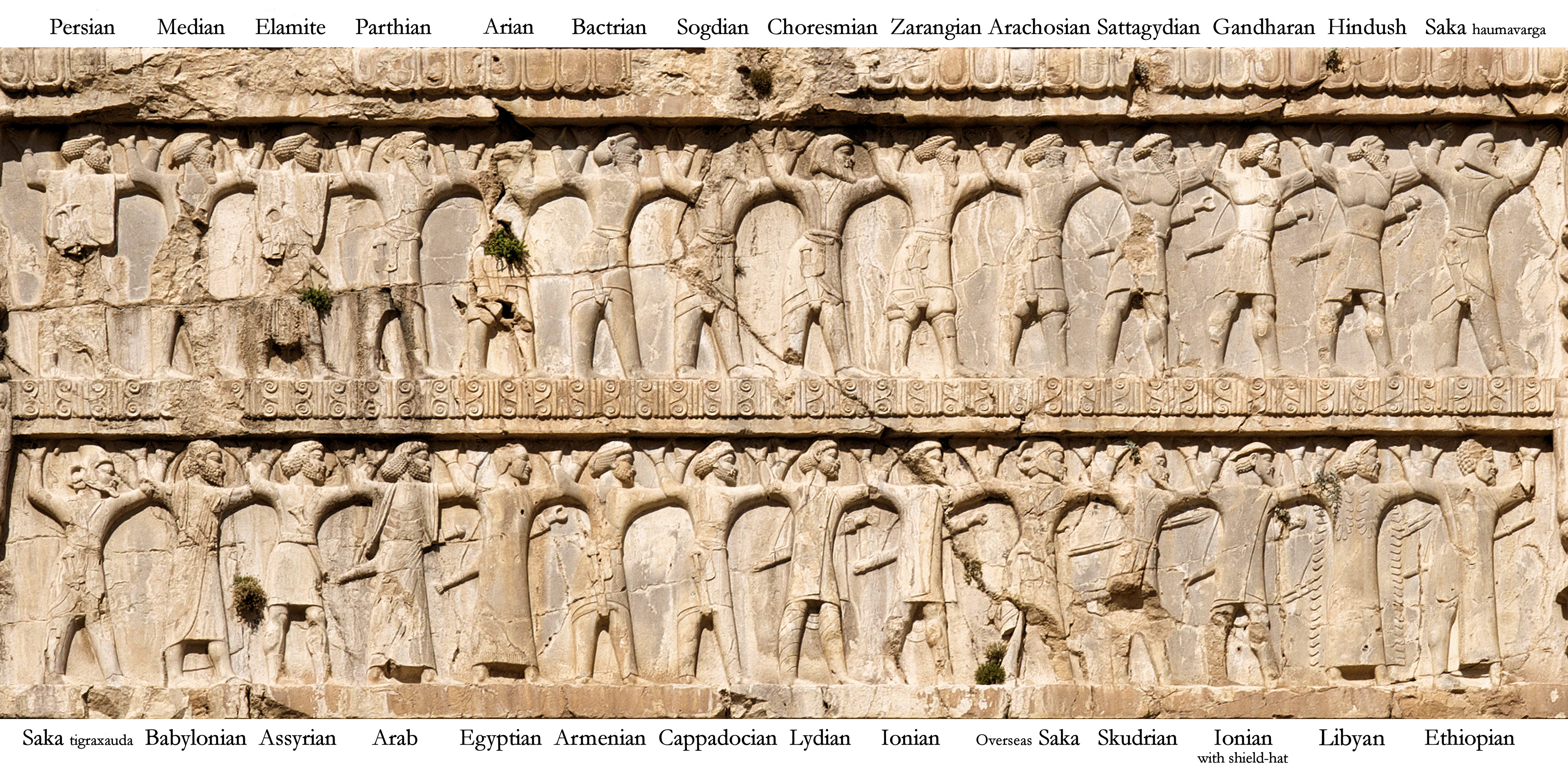
The representatives from the lands of Persian Empire who bear the throne of Xerxes I, of all ethnicities, on the tomb of Xerxes I, at Naqsh-e Rostam.

The numbers of troops that Xerxes mustered for the second invasion of Greece have been the subject of endless dispute. Most modern scholars reject as unrealistic the figures of 2.5 million given by Herodotus and other ancient sources because the victors likely miscalculated or exaggerated. The topic has been hotly debated, but the consensus revolves around the figure of 200,000.

The size of the Persian fleet is also disputed, although perhaps less so. Other ancient authors agree with Herodotus' number of 1,207. These numbers are by ancient standards consistent, and this could be interpreted that a number around 1,200 is correct. Among modern scholars, some have accepted this number, although suggesting the number must have been lower by the Battle of Salamis. Other recent works on the Persian Wars reject this number, viewing 1,207 as more of a reference to the combined Greek fleet in the Iliad. These works generally claim that the Persians could have launched no more than around 600 warships into the Aegean.

=== Greek city states ===
==== Athens ====
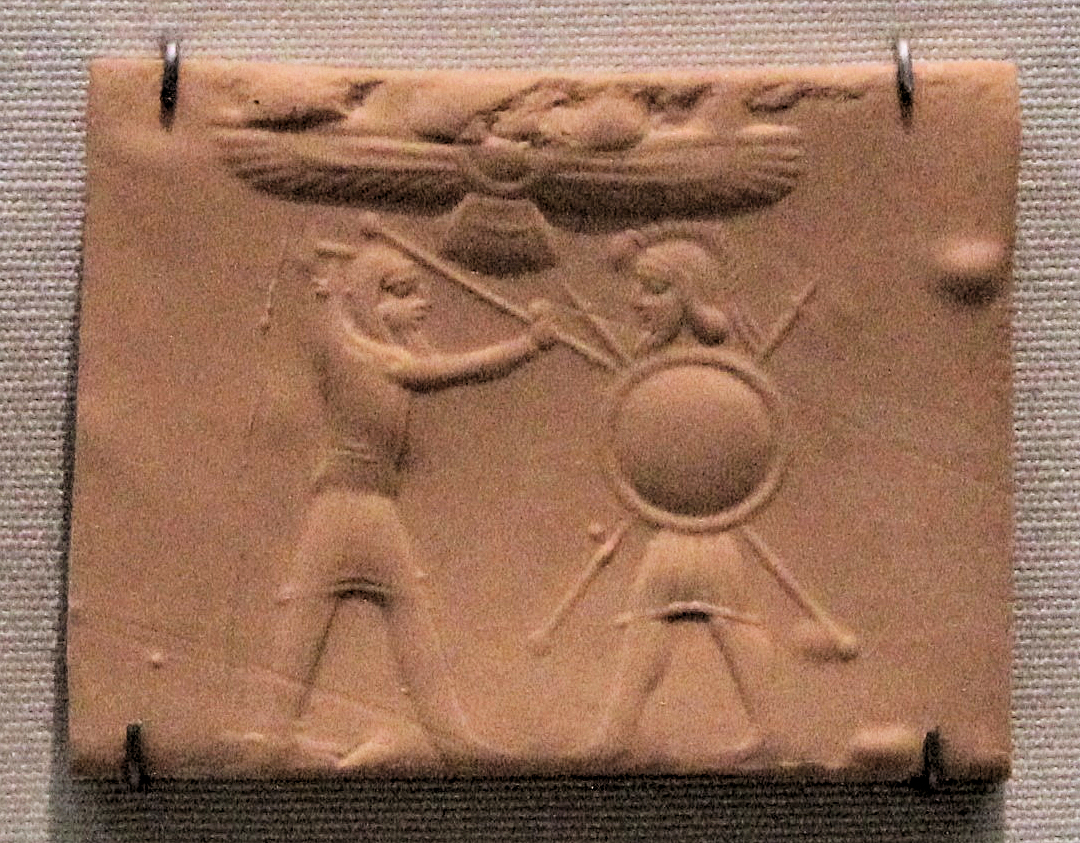
Cylinder seal, chalcedony; depicts a 'Median' (Persian) warrior, on the left, facing a Greek warrior, with hoplite equipment, stabbing him with a lance; above, a winged solar disk. Achaemenid period, 6th–4th century BC. British Museum BM 89333.

A year after Marathon, Miltiades, the hero of Marathon, was injured in a military campaign to Paros. Taking advantage of his incapacitation, the powerful Alcmaeonid family arranged for him to be prosecuted for the failure of the campaign. A huge fine was imposed on Miltiades for the crime of 'deceiving the Athenian people', but he died weeks later from his wound.

The politician Themistocles, with a power base firmly established among the poor, filled the vacuum left by Miltiades's death, and in the following decade became the most influential politician in Athens. During this period, Themistocles continued to support the expansion of Athens' naval power. The Athenians were aware throughout this period that the Persian interest in Greece had not ended, and Themistocles's naval policies may be seen in the light of the potential threat from Persia. Aristides, Themistocles's great rival, and champion of the zeugites (the 'upper hoplite-class') vigorously opposed such a policy.

In 483 BC, a vast new seam of silver was found in the Athenian mines at Laurium. Themistocles proposed that the silver should be used to build a new fleet of triremes, ostensibly to assist in a long running war with Aegina. Plutarch suggests that Themistocles deliberately avoided mentioning Persia, believing that it was too distant a threat for the Athenians to act on, but that countering Persia was the fleet's aim. Fine suggests that some Athenians must have admitted that such a fleet would be needed to resist the Persians, whose preparations for the coming campaign were known. Themistocles's motion was passed easily, despite strong opposition from Aristides. Its passage was probably due to the desire of a number of the poorer Athenians for paid employment as rowers in the fleet. It is unclear from the ancient sources whether 100 or 200 ships were initially authorised; both Fine and Holland suggest that at first 100 ships were authorised and that a second vote increased this number to the levels seen during the second invasion. Aristides continued to oppose Themistocles's policy, and tension between the two camps built over the winter, so the ostracism of 482 BC became a direct contest between Themistocles and Aristides. In what Holland characterises as, in essence, the world's first referendum, Aristides was ostracised, and Themistocles's policies were endorsed. Indeed, becoming aware of the Persian preparations for the coming invasion, the Athenians voted to build more ships than those for which Themistocles had asked. Thus, during the preparations for the Persian invasion, Themistocles had become the leading politician in Athens.

==== Sparta ====
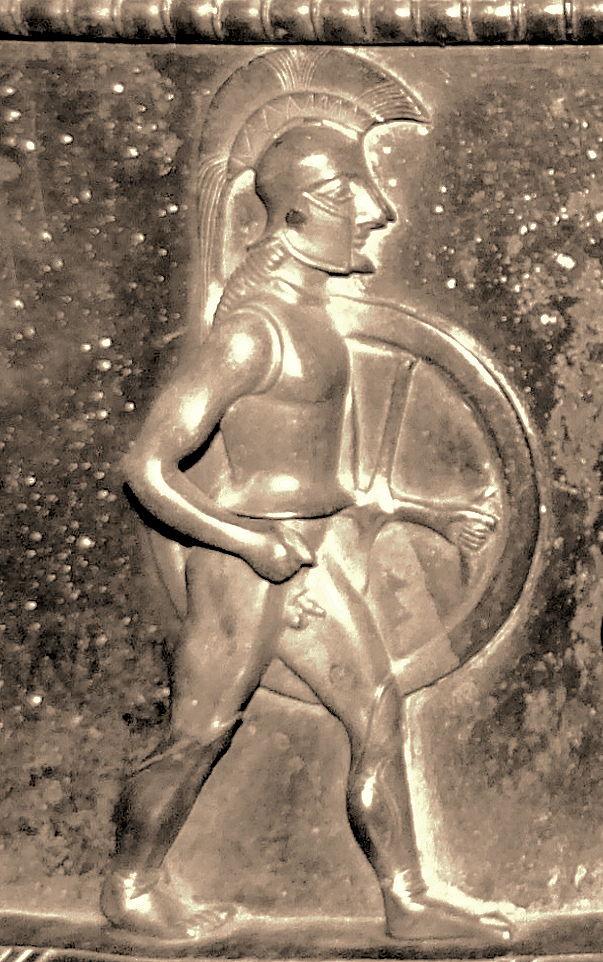
Probable Spartan hoplite (Vix crater, c. 500 BC).

The Spartan king Demaratus had been stripped of his kingship in 491 BC, and replaced with his cousin Leotychides. Sometime after 490 BC, the humiliated Demaratus had chosen to go into exile, and had made his way to Darius's court in Susa. Demaratus would from then on act as an advisor to Darius, and later Xerxes, on Greek affairs, and accompanied Xerxes during the second Persian invasion. At the end of Herodotus's book 7, there is an anecdote relating that prior to the second invasion, Demaratus sent an apparently blank wax tablet to Sparta. When the wax was removed, a message was found scratched on the wooden backing, warning the Spartans of Xerxes's plans. However, some historians believe that this chapter was inserted into the text by a later author, possibly to fill a gap between the end of book 7 and the start of book 8. The veracity of this anecdote is therefore unclear.

==== Hellenic alliance ====
In 481 BC, Xerxes sent ambassadors to city states throughout Greece, asking for food, land, and water as tokens of their submission to Persia. However, Xerxes' ambassadors deliberately avoided Athens and Sparta, hoping thereby that those states would not learn of the Persians' plans. States that were opposed to Persia thus began to coalesce around these two city states. A congress of states met at Corinth in late autumn of 481 BC, and a confederate alliance of Greek city-states was formed. This confederation had powers both to send envoys to ask for assistance and to dispatch troops from the member states to defensive points after joint consultation. Herodotus does not formulate an abstract name for the union but simply calls them "οἱ Ἕλληνες" (the Greeks) and "the Greeks who had sworn alliance" (Godley translation) or "the Greeks who had banded themselves together" (Rawlinson translation). From here on, they will be referred to in this article as the 'Allies'. Sparta and Athens had a leading role in the congress but the interests of all the states influenced defensive strategy. Little is known about the internal workings of the congress or the discussions during its meetings. Only 70 of the nearly 700 Greek city-states sent representatives. Nevertheless, this was remarkable for the disjointed Greek world, especially since a number of the city-states present were still technically at war with one another.

== Second invasion of Greece (480–479 BC) ==
=== Early 480 BC: Thrace, Macedonia, and Thessaly ===
Having crossed into Europe in April 480 BC, the Persian army began its march to Greece, taking 3 months to travel unopposed from the Hellespont to Therme. It paused at Doriskos where it was joined by the fleet. Xerxes reorganized the troops into tactical units replacing the national formations used earlier for the march.

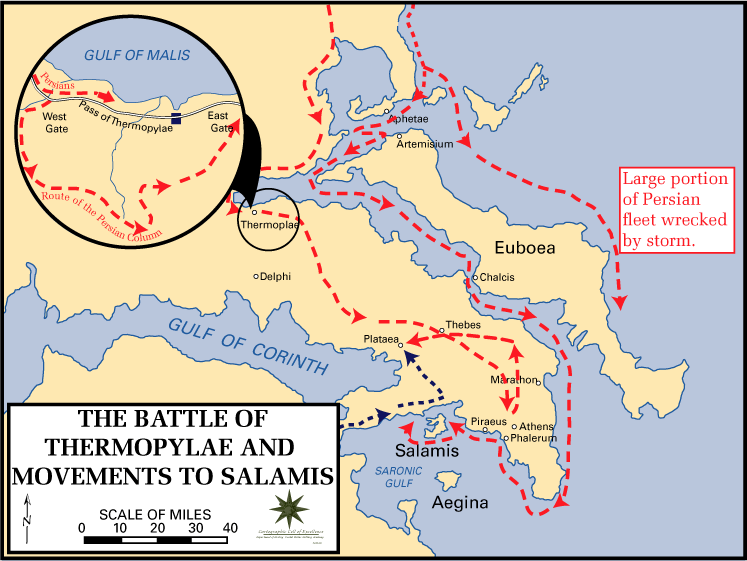
Major events in the second invasion of Greece

The Allied 'congress' met again in the spring of 480 BC and agreed to defend the narrow Vale of Tempe on the borders of Thessaly and block Xerxes's advance. However, once there, they were warned by Alexander I of Macedon that the vale could be bypassed and that the army of Xerxes was overwhelmingly large, thus the Greeks retreated. Shortly afterwards, they received the news that Xerxes had crossed the Hellespont. At this point, a second strategy was suggested by Themistocles to the allies. The route to southern Greece (Boeotia, Attica and the Peloponnesus) would require the army of Xerxes to travel through the narrow pass of Thermopylae. This could easily be blocked by the Greek hoplites, despite the overwhelming numbers of Persians. Furthermore, to prevent the Persians bypassing Thermopylae by sea, the Athenian and allied navies could block the straits of Artemisium. This dual strategy was adopted by the congress. However, the Peloponnesian cities made fall-back plans to defend the Isthmus of Corinth should it come to it, while the women and children of Athens were evacuated to the Peloponnesian city of Troezen.

=== August 480 BC: Battles of Thermopylae and Artemisium ===
Xerxes's estimated time of arrival at Thermopylae coincided with both the Olympic Games and the festival of Carneia. For the Spartans, warfare during these periods was considered sacrilegious. Despite the uncomfortable timing, the Spartans considered the threat so grave that they dispatched their king Leonidas I with his personal bodyguard (the Hippeis) of 300 men. The customary elite young men in the Hippeis were replaced by veterans who already had children. Leonidas was supported by contingents from the Allied Peloponnesian cities, and other forces that the Allies picked up on the way to Thermopylae. The Allies proceeded to occupy the pass, rebuilt the wall the Phocians had built at the narrowest point of the pass, and waited for Xerxes's arrival.

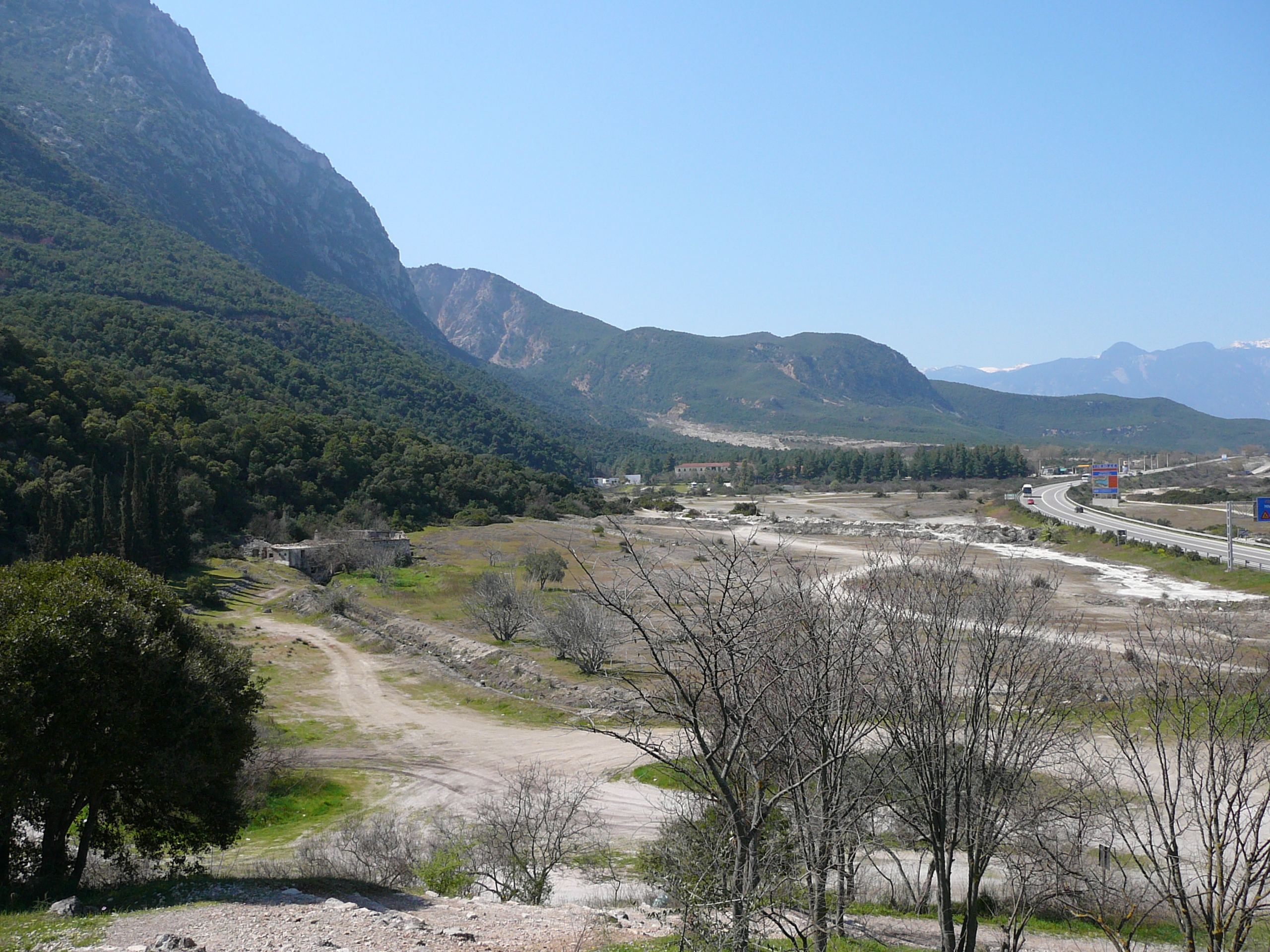
The pass of Thermopylae

When the Persians arrived at Thermopylae in mid-August, they initially waited for three days for the Allies to disperse. When Xerxes was eventually persuaded that the Allies intended to contest the pass, he sent his troops to attack. However, the Allied position was ideally suited to hoplite warfare, the Persian contingents being forced to attack the Greek phalanx head on. The Allies withstood two full days of Persian attacks, including those by the elite Persian Immortals. However, towards the end of the second day, they were betrayed by a local resident named Ephialtes who revealed to Xerxes a mountain path that led behind the Allied lines, according to Herodotus. Herodotus has often been dismissed as a 'story teller', by Aristotle himself among others, and this may be a piece of folklore to create a more engaging narrative. In any case, it is impossible to determine with absolute certainty the legitimacy of Ephialtes' involvement in the battle. The Anopoea path was defended by roughly 1000 Phocians, according to Herodotus, who reportedly fled when confronted by the Persians. Made aware by scouts that they were being outflanked, Leonidas dismissed most of the Allied army, remaining to guard the rear with perhaps 2,000 men. On the final day of the battle, the remaining Allies sallied forth from the wall to meet the Persians in the wider part of the pass to slaughter as many Persians as they could, but eventually they were all killed or captured.

Simultaneous with the battle at Thermopylae, an Allied naval force of 271 triremes defended the Straits of Artemisium against the Persians, thus protecting the flank of the forces at Thermopylae. Here the Allied fleet held off the Persians for three days; however, on the third evening the Allies received news of the fate of Leonidas and the Allied troops at Thermopylae. Since the Allied fleet was badly damaged, and since it no longer needed to defend the flank of Thermopylae, the Allies retreated from Artemisium to the island of Salamis.

=== September 480 BC: Battle of Salamis ===
Victory at Thermopylae meant that all Boeotia fell to Xerxes; Attica was then open to invasion. The remaining population of Athens was evacuated, with the aid of the Allied fleet, to Salamis. The Peloponnesian Allies began to prepare a defensive line across the Isthmus of Corinth, building a wall, and demolishing the road from Megara, abandoning Athens to the Persians. Athens thus fell to the Persians; the small number of Athenians who had barricaded themselves on the Acropolis were eventually defeated, and Xerxes then ordered the destruction of Athens.

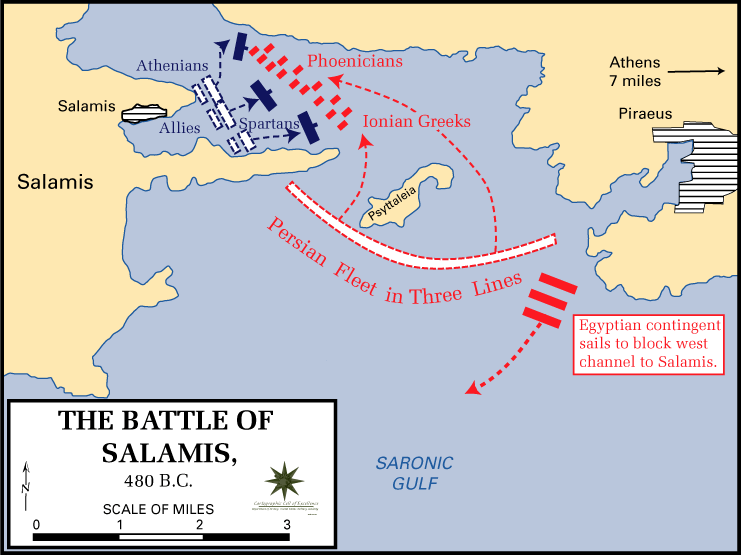
Schematic diagram illustrating events during the Battle of Salamis

The Persians had now captured most of Greece, but Xerxes had perhaps not expected such defiance; his priority was now to complete the war as quickly as possible. If Xerxes could destroy the Allied navy, he would be in a strong position to force an Allied surrender; conversely by avoiding destruction, or as Themistocles hoped, by destroying the Persian fleet, the Allies could prevent conquest from being completed. The Allied fleet thus remained off the coast of Salamis into September, despite the imminent arrival of the Persians. Even after Athens fell, the Allied fleet remained off the coast of Salamis, trying to lure the Persian fleet to battle. Partly because of deception by Themistocles, the navies met in the cramped Straits of Salamis. There, the Persian numbers became a hindrance, as ships struggled to maneuver and became disorganised. Seizing the opportunity, the Allied fleet attacked, and scored a decisive victory, sinking or capturing at least 200 Persian ships, therefore ensuring the safety of the Peloponnessus.

According to Herodotus, after the loss of the battle Xerxes attempted to build a causeway across the channel to attack the Athenian evacuees on Salamis, but this project was soon abandoned. With the Persians' naval superiority removed, Xerxes feared that the Allies might sail to the Hellespont and destroy the pontoon bridges. His general Mardonius volunteered to remain in Greece and complete the conquest with a hand-picked group of troops, while Xerxes retreated to Asia with the bulk of the army. Mardonius over-wintered in Boeotia and Thessaly; the Athenians were thus able to return to their burnt-out city for the winter.

=== June 479 BC: Battles of Plataea and Mycale ===
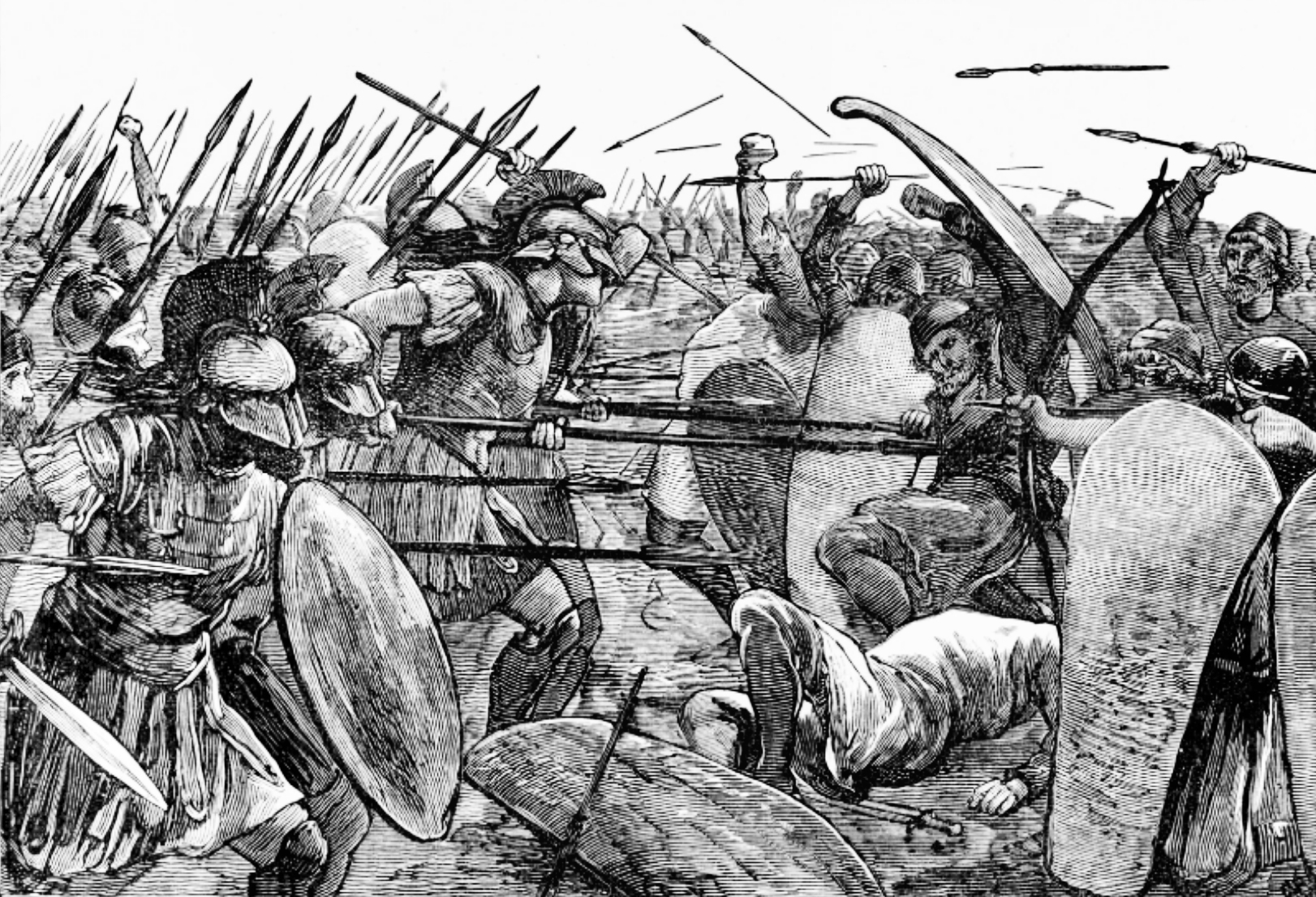
Spartans fighting against Persian forces at the Battle of Plataea. 19th century illustration.

Over the winter, there was some tension among the Allies. In particular, the Athenians, who were not protected by the Isthmus, but whose fleet was the key to the security of the Peloponnesus, felt that they had been treated unfairly, and so they refused to join the Allied navy in the spring. Mardonius remained in Thessaly, knowing an attack on the Isthmus was pointless, while the Allies refused to send an army outside the Peloponessus. Mardonius moved to break the stalemate, by offering peace to the Athenians, using Alexander I of Macedon as an intermediate. The Athenians made sure that a Spartan delegation was on hand to hear the Athenians reject the Persians' offer. Athens was thus evacuated again, and the Persians marched south and re-took possession of it. Mardonius now repeated his offer of peace to the Athenian refugees on Salamis. Athens, with Megara and Plataea, sent emissaries to Sparta demanding assistance, and threatening to accept the Persian terms if they were not aided. In response, the Spartans summoned a large army from the Peloponnese cities and marched to meet the Persians.

When Mardonius heard the Allied army was on the march, he retreated into Boeotia, near Plataea, trying to draw the Allies into open terrain where he could use his cavalry. The Allied army, under the command of the regent Pausanias, stayed on high ground above Plataea to protect themselves against such tactics. After several days of maneuver and stalemate, Pausanias ordered a night-time retreat towards the Allies' original positions. This maneuver went awry, leaving the Athenians, and Spartans and Tegeans isolated on separate hills, with the other contingents scattered further away near Plataea. Seeing that the Persians might never have a better opportunity to attack, Mardonius ordered his whole army forward. However, the Persian infantry proved no match for the heavily armoured Greek hoplites, and the Spartans broke through to Mardonius's bodyguard and killed him. After this the Persian force dissolved in rout; 40,000 troops managed to escape via the road to Thessaly, but the rest fled to the Persian camp where they were trapped and slaughtered by the Greeks, finalising the Greek victory.

Herodotus recounts that, on the afternoon of the Battle of Plataea, a rumour of their victory at that battle reached the Allies' navy, at that time off the coast of Mount Mycale in Ionia. Their morale boosted, the Allied marines fought and won a decisive victory at the Battle of Mycale that same day, destroying the remnants of the Persian fleet, crippling Xerxes's sea power, and marking the ascendancy of the Greek fleet. While a number of modern historians doubt that Mycale took place on the same day as Plataea, the battle may well only have occurred once the Allies received news of the events unfolding in Greece.

== Greek counterattack (479–478 BC) ==
=== Mycale and Ionia ===
Mycale was, in a number of ways, the beginning of a new phase in the conflict, in which the Greeks would go on the offensive against the Persians. The immediate result of the victory at Mycale was a second revolt among the Greek cities of Asia Minor. The Samians and Milesians had actively fought against the Persians at Mycale, thus openly declaring their rebellion, and the other cities followed in their example.

=== Sestos ===
Shortly after Mycale, the Allied fleet sailed to the Hellespont to break down the pontoon bridges, but found that this had already been done. The Peloponnesians sailed home, but the Athenians remained to attack the Chersonesos, still held by the Persians. The Persians and their allies made for Sestos, the strongest town in the region. Among them was one Oeobazus of Cardia, who had with him the cables and other equipment from the pontoon bridges. The Persian governor, Artayctes had not prepared for a siege, not believing that the Allies would attack. The Athenians therefore were able to lay a siege around Sestos. The siege dragged on for several months, causing some discontent among the Athenian troops, but eventually, when the food ran out in the city, the Persians fled at night from the least guarded area of the city. The Athenians were thus able to take possession of the city the next day.

Most of the Athenian troops were sent straight away to pursue the Persians. The party of Oeobazus was captured by a Thracian tribe, and Oeobazus was sacrificed to the god Plistorus. The Athenians eventually caught Artayctes, killing some of the Persians with him but taking most of them, including Artayctes, captive. Artayctes was crucified at the request of the people of Elaeus, a town which Artayctes had plundered while governor of the Chersonesos. The Athenians, having pacified the region, then sailed back to Athens, taking the cables from the pontoon bridges with them as trophies.

=== Cyprus ===
In 478 BC, still operating under the terms of the Hellenic alliance, the Allies sent out a fleet composed of 20 Peloponnesian and 30 Athenian ships supported by an unspecified number of allies, under the overall command of Pausanias. According to Thucydides, this fleet sailed to Cyprus and "subdued most of the island". Exactly what Thucydides means by this is unclear. Sealey suggests that this was essentially a raid to gather as much treasure as possible from the Persian garrisons on Cyprus. There is no indication that the Allies attempted to take possession of the island, and, shortly after, they sailed to Byzantium. Certainly, the fact that the Delian League repeatedly campaigned in Cyprus suggests either that the island was not garrisoned by the Allies in 478 BC, or that the garrisons were quickly expelled.

=== Byzantium ===
The Greek fleet then sailed to Byzantium, which they besieged and eventually captured. Control of both Sestos and Byzantium gave the allies command of the straits between Europe and Asia (over which the Persians had crossed), and allowed them access to the merchant trade of the Black Sea.

The aftermath of the siege was to prove troublesome for Pausanias the Regent. Exactly what happened is unclear; Thucydides gives few details, although later writers added plenty of lurid insinuations.

Through his arrogance and arbitrary actions (Thucydides says "violence"), Pausanias managed to alienate a number of the Allied contingents, particularly those that had just been freed from Persian overlordship. The Ionians and others asked the Athenians to take leadership of the campaign, to which they agreed. The Spartans, hearing of his behaviour, recalled Pausanias and tried him on charges of collaborating with the enemy. Although he was acquitted, his reputation was tarnished and he was not restored to his command.

Pausanias returned to Byzantium as a private citizen in 477 BC, and took command of the city until he was expelled by the Athenians. He then crossed the Bosporus and settled in Kolonai in the Troad, until he was again accused of collaborating with the Persians and was recalled by the Spartans for a trial after which he starved himself to death.

The timescale is unclear, but Pausanias may have remained in possession of Byzantium until 470 BC.

In the meantime, the Spartans had sent Dorkis to Byzantium with a small force, to take command of the Allied force. However, he found that the rest of the Allies were no longer prepared to accept Spartan leadership, and therefore returned home.

== Wars of the Delian League (477–449 BC) ==
=== Delian League ===
Athens and her empire in 431 BC. The empire was the direct descendant of the Delian League

After Byzantium, the Spartans were allegedly eager to end their involvement in the war. The Spartans were supposedly of the view that, with the liberation of mainland Greece and the Greek cities of Asia Minor, the war's purpose had already been reached. There was also perhaps a feeling that securing long-term security for the Asian Greeks would prove impossible. In the aftermath of Mycale, the Spartan king Leotychides had proposed transplanting all the Greeks from Asia Minor to Europe as the only method of permanently freeing them from Persian dominion. Xanthippus, the Athenian commander at Mycale, had furiously rejected this; the Ionian cities were originally Athenian colonies, and the Athenians, if no one else, would protect the Ionians. This marks the point at which the leadership of the Greek Alliance effectively passed to the Athenians. With the Spartan withdrawal after Byzantium, the leadership of the Athenians became explicit.

The loose alliance of city-states that had fought against Xerxes's invasion had been dominated by Sparta and the Peloponnesian league. With the withdrawal of these states, a congress was called on the holy island of Delos to institute a new alliance to continue the fight against the Persians. This alliance, now including a number of the Aegean islands, was formally constituted as the 'First Athenian Alliance', commonly known as the Delian League. According to Thucydides, the official aim of the League was to "avenge the wrongs they suffered by ravaging the territory of the king". In reality, this goal was divided into three main efforts—to prepare for future invasion, to seek revenge against Persia, and to organize a means of dividing spoils of war. The members were given a choice of either supplying armed forces or paying a tax to the joint treasury; most states chose the tax.

=== Campaigns against Persia ===
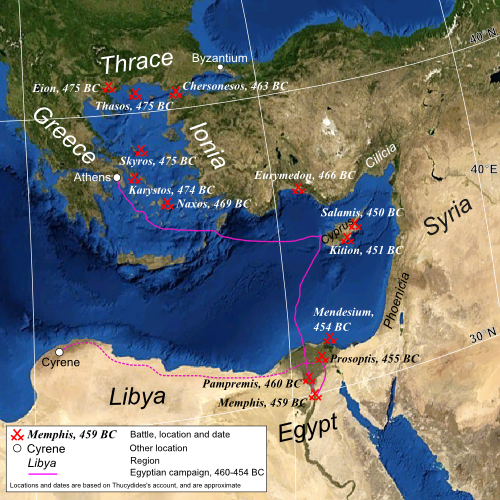
Map showing the locations of battles fought by the Delian League, 477–449 BC

Throughout the 470s BC, the Delian League campaigned in Thrace and the Aegean to remove the remaining Persian garrisons from the region, primarily under the command of the Athenian politician Cimon. In the early part of the next decade, Cimon began campaigning in Asia Minor, seeking to strengthen the Greek position there. At the Battle of the Eurymedon in Pamphylia, the Athenians and allied fleet achieved a stunning double victory, destroying a Persian fleet and then landing the ships' marines to attack and rout the Persian army. After this battle, the Persians took an essentially passive role in the conflict, anxious not to risk battle if possible.

Towards the end of the 460s BC, the Athenians took the ambitious decision to support a revolt in the Egyptian satrapy of the Persian empire. Although the Greek task force achieved initial successes, they were unable to capture the Persian garrison in Memphis, despite a three-year long siege. The Persians then counterattacked, and the Athenian force was itself besieged for 18 months, before being wiped out. This disaster, coupled with ongoing warfare in Greece, dissuaded the Athenians from resuming conflict with Persia. In 451 BC however, a truce was agreed in Greece, and Cimon was then able to lead an expedition to Cyprus. However, while besieging Kition, Cimon died, and the Athenian force decided to withdraw, winning another double victory at the Battle of Salamis-in-Cyprus to extricate themselves. This campaign marked the end of hostilities between the Delian League and Persia, and therefore the end of the Greco-Persian Wars.

== Peace with Persia ==
After the Battle of Salamis-in-Cyprus, Thucydides makes no further mention of conflict with the Persians, saying that the Greeks simply returned home. Diodorus, on the other hand, claims that in the aftermath of Salamis, a proper peace treaty (the "Peace of Callias") was agreed with the Persians. Diodorus was probably following the history of Ephorus at this point, who in turn was presumably influenced by his teacher Isocrates—from whom there is the earliest reference to the supposed peace, in 380 BC. Even during the 4th century BC, the idea of the treaty was controversial, and two authors from that period, Callisthenes and Theopompus, appear to reject its existence.

It is possible that the Athenians had attempted to negotiate with the Persians previously. Plutarch suggests that in the aftermath of the victory at the Eurymedon, Artaxerxes had agreed to a peace treaty with the Greeks, even naming Callias as the Athenian ambassador involved. However, as Plutarch admits, Callisthenes denied that such a peace was made at this point (c. 466 BC). Herodotus also mentions, in passing, an Athenian embassy headed by Callias, which was sent to Susa to negotiate with Artaxerxes. This embassy included some Argive representatives and can probably be therefore dated to c. 461 BC (after an alliance was agreed between Athens and Argos). This embassy may have been an attempt to reach some kind of peace agreement, and it has even been suggested that the failure of these hypothetical negotiations led to the Athenian decision to support the Egyptian revolt. The ancient sources therefore disagree as to whether there was an official peace or not, and, if there was, when it was agreed.

Opinion among modern historians is also split; for instance, Fine accepts the concept of the Peace of Callias, whereas Sealey effectively rejects it. Holland accepts that some kind of accommodation was made between Athens and Persia, but no actual treaty. Fine argues that Callisthenes's denial that a treaty was made after the Eurymedon does not preclude a peace being made at another point. Further, he suggests that Theopompus was actually referring to a treaty that had allegedly been negotiated with Persia in 423 BC. If these views are correct, it would remove one major obstacle to the acceptance of the treaty's existence. A further argument for the existence of the treaty is the sudden withdrawal of the Athenians from Cyprus in 449 BC, which Fine suggests makes most sense in the light of some kind of peace agreement. On the other hand, if there was indeed some kind of accommodation, Thucydides's failure to mention it is odd. In his digression on the pentekontaetia, his aim is to explain the growth of Athenian power, and such a treaty, and the fact that the Delian allies were not released from their obligations after it, would have marked a major step in the Athenian ascendancy. Conversely, it has been suggested that certain passages elsewhere in Thucydides's history are best interpreted as referring to a peace agreement. There is thus no clear consensus among modern historians as to the treaty's existence.

The ancient sources that give details of the treaty are reasonably consistent in their description of the terms:

- All Greek cities of Asia were to 'live by their own laws' or 'be autonomous' (depending on translation).
- Persian satraps (and presumably their armies) were not to travel west of the Halys River (Isocrates) or closer than a day's journey on horseback to the Aegean Sea (Callisthenes) or closer than three days' journey on foot to the Aegean Sea (Ephorus and Diodorus).
- No Persian warship was to sail west of Phaselis (on the southern coast of Asia Minor), nor west of the Cyanaean rocks (probably at the eastern end of the Bosporus, on the north coast).
- If the terms were observed by the king and his generals, then the Athenians were not to send troops to lands ruled by Persia.

From the Persian perspective, such terms would not be so humiliating as they might at first seem. The Persians already agreed that the Greek cities of Asia would remain governed under their own laws (under the reorganization conducted by Artaphernes, following the Ionian Revolt). By these terms, the Ionians were still Persian subjects, as they had been. Furthermore, Athens had already demonstrated their superiority at sea at the Eurymedon and Salamis-in-Cyprus, so any legal limitations for the Persian fleet were nothing more than "de jure" recognition of military realities. In exchange for limiting the movement of Persian troops in one region of the realm, Artaxerxes secured a promise from the Athenians to stay out of his entire realm.

== Aftermath and later conflicts ==
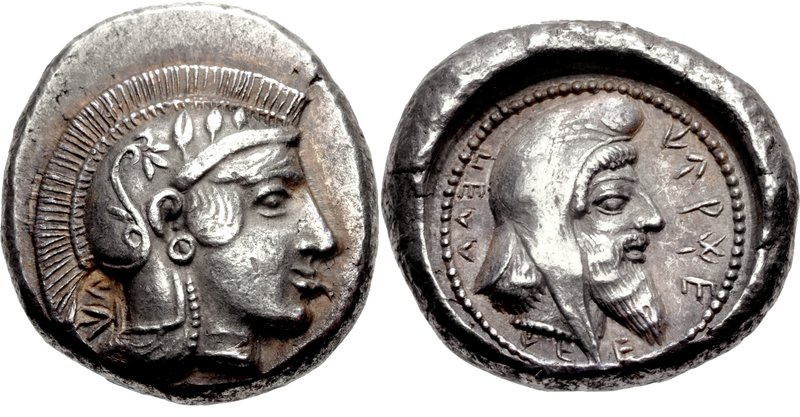
Dynast of Lycia, Kherei, with Athena on the obverse, and himself wearing the Persian cap on the reverse. c. 440/30–410 BC.

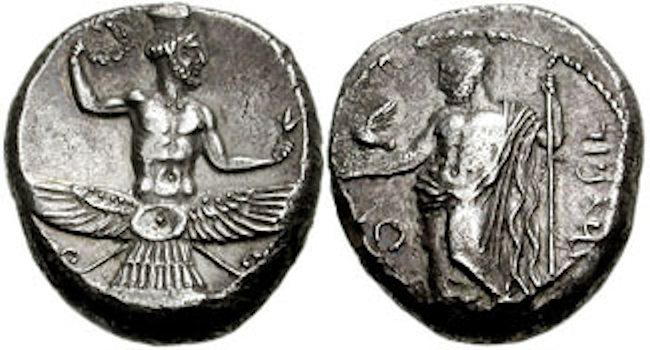
Coinage of Tiribazos, Satrap of Lydia, with Faravahar on the obverse. 388–380 BC.

Towards the end of the conflict with Persia, the process by which the Delian League became the Athenian Empire reached its conclusion. The allies of Athens were not released from their obligations to provide either money or ships, despite the cessation of hostilities. In Greece, the First Peloponnesian War between the power-blocs of Athens and Sparta, which had continued on/off since 460 BC, finally ended in 445 BC, with the agreement of a thirty-year truce. However, the growing enmity between Sparta and Athens would lead, just 14 years later, into the outbreak of the Second Peloponnesian War. This disastrous conflict, which dragged on for 27 years, would eventually result in the utter destruction of Athenian power, the dismemberment of the Athenian empire, and the establishment of a Spartan hegemony over Greece. However, not just Athens suffered—the conflict would significantly weaken the whole of Greece.

Repeatedly defeated in battle by the Greeks, and plagued by internal rebellions that hindered their ability to fight the Greeks, after 449 BC, Artaxerxes I and his successors instead adopted a policy of divide-and-rule. Avoiding fighting the Greeks themselves, the Persians instead attempted to set Athens against Sparta, regularly bribing politicians to achieve their aims. In this way, they ensured that the Greeks remained distracted by internal conflicts, and were unable to turn their attentions to Persia. There was no open conflict between the Greeks and Persia until 396 BC, when the Spartan king Agesilaus briefly invaded Asia Minor; as Plutarch points out, the Greeks were far too busy overseeing the destruction of their own power to fight against the "barbarians".

If the wars of the Delian League shifted the balance of power between Greece and Persia in favour of the Greeks, then the subsequent half-century of internecine conflict in Greece did much to restore the balance of power to Persia. The Persians entered the Peloponnesian War in 411 BC forming a mutual-defence pact with Sparta and combining their naval resources against Athens in exchange for sole Persian control of Ionia. In 404 BC when Cyrus the Younger attempted to seize the Persian throne, he recruited 13,000 Greek mercenaries from all over the Greek world, of which Sparta sent 700–800, believing they were following the terms of the defence pact and unaware of the army's true purpose. After the failure of Cyrus, Persia tried to regain control of the Ionian city-states, which had rebelled during the conflict. The Ionians refused to capitulate and called upon Sparta for assistance, which she provided, in 396–395 BC. Athens, however, sided with the Persians, which led in turn to another large-scale conflict in Greece, the Corinthian War. Towards the end of that conflict, in 387 BC, Sparta sought the aid of Persia to shore up her position. Under the so-called "King's Peace" that brought the war to an end, Artaxerxes II demanded and received the return of the cities of Asia Minor from the Spartans, in return for which the Persians threatened to make war on any Greek state that did not make peace. This humiliating treaty, which undid all the Greek gains of the previous century, sacrificed the Greeks of Asia Minor so that the Spartans could maintain their hegemony over Greece. It is in the aftermath of this treaty that Greek orators began to refer to the Peace of Callias (whether fictional or not), as a counterpoint to the shame of the King's Peace, and a glorious example of the "good old days" when the Greeks of the Aegean had been freed from Persian rule by the Delian League.

== See also ==
- History of Greece
- History of Iran
- List of wars extended by diplomatic irregularity
- Hellenic League

== Notes ==
i: The exact period covered by the term "Greco-Persian Wars" is open to interpretation, and usage varies between academics; the Ionian Revolt and Wars of the Delian League are sometimes excluded. This article covers the maximum extent of the wars.
ii: Archaeological evidence for the Panionion before the 6th century BC is very weak, and possibly this temple was a relatively late development.
iii: Although historically inaccurate, the legend of a Greek messenger running to Athens with news of the victory and then promptly expiring, became the inspiration for this athletics event, introduced at the 1896 Athens Olympics, and originally run between Marathon and Athens.
iv: Not limited to those mentioned in the following list.

== Bibliography ==
=== Ancient sources ===
- Herodotus, The Histories (Godley translation, 1920)
- Thucydides, History of the Peloponnesian War
- Xenophon, Anabasis, Hellenica
- Plutarch, Parallel Lives; Themistocles, Aristides, Pericles, Cimon
- Diodorus Siculus, Bibliotheca historica
- Cornelius Nepos, Lives of the Eminent Commanders; Miltiades, Themistocles

=== Modern sources ===
- Dandamaev, M. A. (1989). A Political History of the Achaemenid Empire. Translated by Vogelsang, Willem. Leiden: Brill. ISBN 978-90-04-09172-6.
- Fine, John Van Antwerp (1983). The Ancient Greeks: A Critical History. Cambridge: Harvard University Press. ISBN 978-0-674-03314-6.
- Finley, Moses (1972). "Introduction". In Warner, Rex (ed.). Thucydides – History of the Peloponnesian War. Westminster: Penguin. ISBN 978-0-14-044039-3.
- Holland, Tom (2006). Persian Fire: The First World Empire and the Battle for the West. London: Abacus. ISBN 978-0-349-11717-1.
- Kagan, Donald (1989). The Outbreak of the Peloponnesian War. Ithaca: Cornell University Press. ISBN 0-8014-9556-3.
- Lazenby, J.F. (1993). The Defence of Greece 490–479 BC. Warminster: Aris & Phillips Ltd. ISBN 978-0-85668-591-0.
- Roisman, Joseph; Worthington, Ian (2011). A Companion to Ancient Macedonia. Hoboken: John Wiley and Sons. ISBN 978-1-44-435163-7.
- Sealey, Raphael (1976). A History of the Greek City States, 700–338 B.C. Berkeley: University of California Press. ISBN 978-0-520-03177-7.
