= Battle of the Eurymedon =

Battle between the Delian League and the Achaemenid Empire

- Part of the Wars of the Delian League
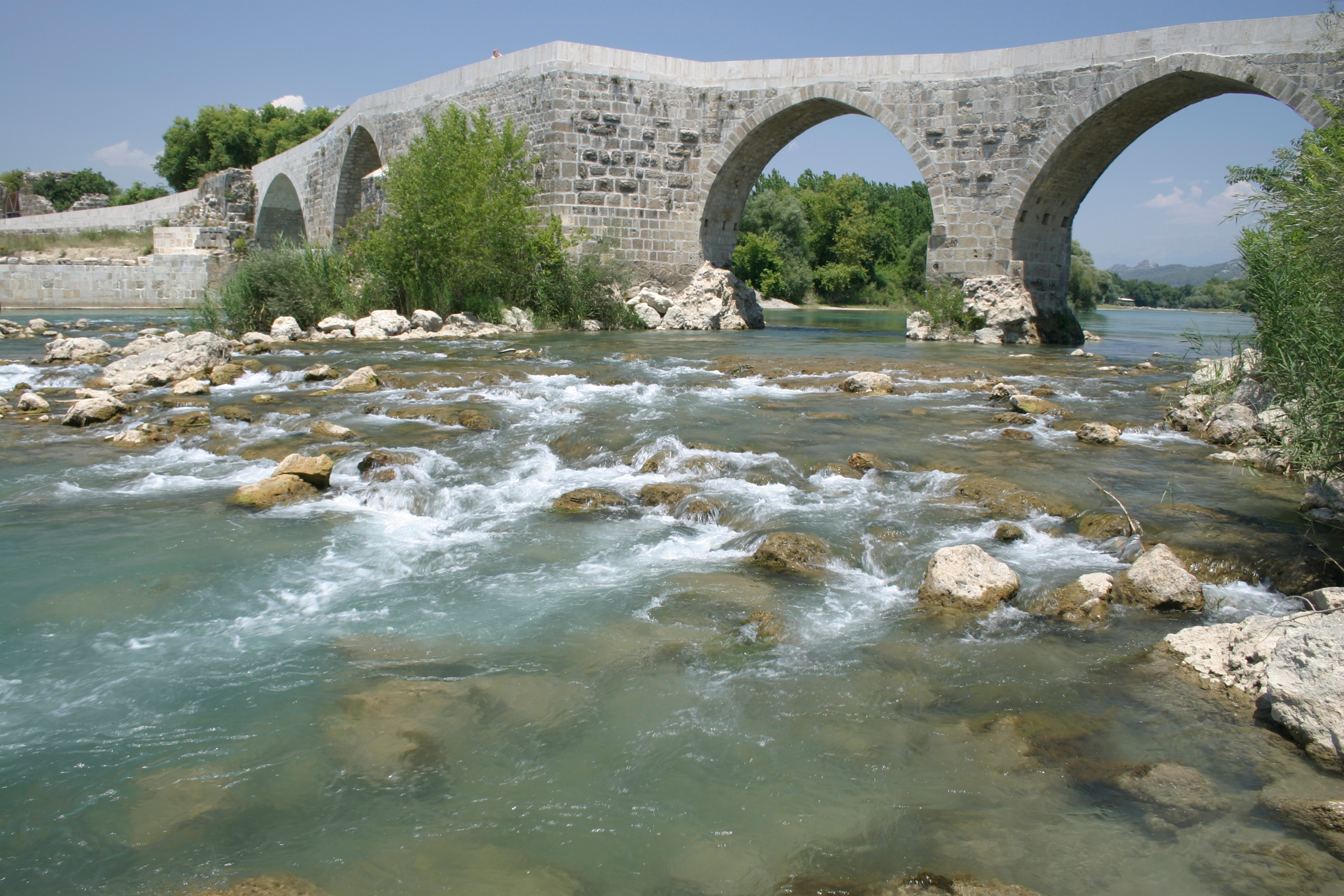
- The Eurymedon River, near Aspendos
Date	469 or 466 BCE
Location	Eurymedon River (modern-day Köprüçay River, Antalya, Turkey) 36°49′48″N 31°10′23″E
Result	Greek victory

Belligerents
Delian League	Achaemenid Empire

Commanders and leaders
Cimon	Tithraustes, Pherendatis †

Strength
200 ships	200–350 ships

Casualties and losses
Unknown	200 ships destroyed
- Location of the Battle of the Eurymedon

The Battle of the Eurymedon was a double battle, taking place both on water and land, between the Delian League of Athens and her Allies, and the Persian Empire of Xerxes I. It took place in either 469 or 466 BCE, in the vicinity of the mouth of the Eurymedon River (now the Köprüçay) in Pamphylia, Asia Minor. It forms part of the Wars of the Delian League, itself part of the larger Greco-Persian Wars.

The Delian League had been formed between Athens and many of the city-states of the Aegean to continue the war with Persia, which had begun with the first and second Persian invasions of Greece (492–490 and 480–479 BCE, respectively). In the aftermath of the Battles of Plataea and Mycale, which had ended the second invasion, the Greek Allies had taken the offensive, besieging the cities of Sestos and Byzantium. The Delian League then took over responsibility for the war, and continued to attack Persian bases in the Aegean throughout the next decade.

In either 469 or 466 BCE, the Persians began assembling a large army and navy for a major offensive against the Greeks. Gathering near the Eurymedon, it is possible that the expedition aimed to move up the coast of Asia Minor, capturing each city in turn. This would bring the Asiatic Greek regions back under Persian control, and give the Persians naval bases from which to launch further expeditions into the Aegean. Hearing of the Persian preparations, the Athenian general Cimon took 200 triremes and sailed to Phaselis in Pamphylia, which eventually agreed to join the Delian League. This effectively blocked the Persian strategy at its first objective.

Cimon then moved to pre-emptively attack the Persian forces near the Eurymedon. Sailing into the mouth of the river, Cimon quickly routed the Persian fleet gathered there. Most of the Persian fleet made landfall, and the sailors fled to the shelter of the Persian army. Cimon then landed the Greek marines and proceeded to attack the Persian army, which was also routed. The Greeks captured the Persian camp, taking many prisoners, and were able to destroy 200 beached Persian triremes. This stunning double victory seems to have greatly demoralised the Persians, and prevented any further Persian campaigning in the Aegean until at least 451 BCE. However, the Delian League do not appear to have pressed home their advantage, probably because of other events in the Greek world that required their attention.

== Sources and chronology ==
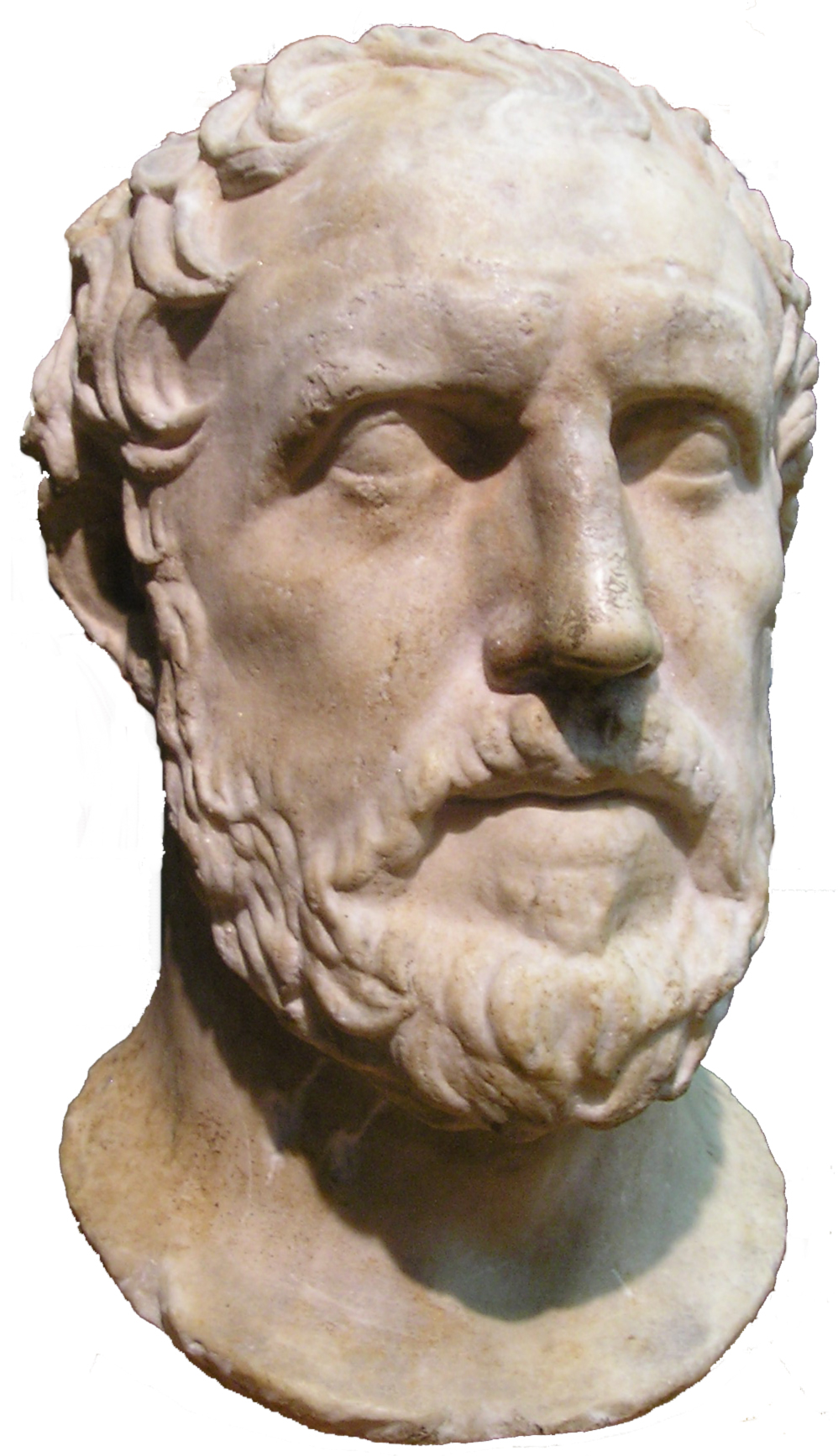
Thucydides, whose history provides many of the details of this period

The military history of Greece between the second Persian invasion (480–479 BC) and the Peloponnesian War (431-404 BC) is poorly attested by surviving ancient sources. This period, sometimes referred to as the pentekontaetia by scholars, was one of relative peace and prosperity within Greece. The richest source for the period, and also the most contemporary with it, is the History of the Peloponnesian War by Thucydides, which is generally considered by modern historians to be a reliable primary account. Thucydides only mentions the pentekontaetia period in a digression, discussing the growth of Athenian power in the run up to the Peloponnesian War. The digression is brief, probably selective, and lacks any dates. Nevertheless, historians have used Thucydides' account to construct a rough chronology for the period, as a basis for interpreting archaeological records and other writers.

Additional details are provided by Plutarch's Parallel Lives biographies of Aristides and especially Cimon. Plutarch wrote six centuries after the events, so is a secondary source, but he often explicitly names his sources which allows some verification of his statements. In his biographies, Plutarch explicitly draws on many ancient histories that have not survived, preserving details of the period that Thucydides's account omits.

The only other major extant source for the period is Bibliotheca historica, a universal history written in the 1st century BC by Diodorus Siculus. Much of Diodorus's description of this period seems to be derived from the much earlier Greek historian Ephorus, who also wrote a universal history which is now lost. However, modern historians generally disparage Ephorus' history. Diodorus, who has often been dismissed by modern historians, is therefore not a particularly good source for this period. The historian Charles Henry Oldfather, who translated Diodorus' account into English, commented on the passage describing the Eurymedon campaign: "the three preceding chapters reveal Diodorus in the worst light".

There is also a body of archaeological evidence for the period, including inscriptions. Particularly useful are probable tribute lists for the members of the Delian League.

=== Chronology ===
There is no wide agreement on the precise date of the battle, with most authorities placing it in either 469 or 466. Thucydides provides a succinct list of the main events occurring in this period, but almost no chronological information. The surest fact of the battle is that it predated the revolt of Athens' ally Thasos in or just before the Athenian calendar year 465/4. Thucydides also narrates Eurymedon after the revolt of Naxos, which the same author in turn associates with the flight of Themistocles to Persia and the death of Persian king Xerxes in 465, suggesting that the battle was fought no earlier than 466. But the date of Naxos's revolt is itself a matter of dispute, and Thucydides may not have narrated these events in strict chronological order.

The earlier date for the battle is hinted by the choice of Cimon, the Athenian commander at Eurymedon, together with the entire college of generals, to serve as judges in a tragic competition which is dated to spring 468. Many historians hold that this was done because a great victory involving all generals had been achieved, and that the most likely candidate for such is the battle of Eurymedon, which will have taken place in the previous year, 469. Critics point out that this is not direct evidence, and prefer dating the battle closer to the revolt of Thasos in 465.

== Background ==
The Greco-Persian Wars had their roots in the conquest of the Greek cities of Asia Minor, and in particular Ionia, by the Persian Empire of Cyrus the Great shortly after 550 BC. The Persians found the Ionians difficult to rule, eventually settling for sponsoring a tyrant in each Ionian city. While Greek states had in the past often been ruled by tyrants, this was a form of government on the decline. By 500 BC, Ionia appears to have been ripe for rebellion. The simmering tension finally broke into open revolt due to the actions of the tyrant of Miletus, Aristagoras. Attempting to save himself after a disastrous Persian-sponsored expedition in 499 BC, Aristagoras chose to declare Miletus a democracy. This triggered similar revolutions across Ionia, and indeed Doris and Aeolis, beginning the Ionian Revolt.

Map showing main events of the Ionian Revolt and the Persian invasions of Greece.

The Greek states of Athens and Eretria allowed themselves to be drawn into this conflict by Aristagoras, and during their only campaigning season (498 BC) they contributed to the capture and burning of the Persian regional capital of Sardis. After this, the Ionian Revolt carried on (without further outside aid) for a further 5 years, until it was finally completely crushed by the Persians. However, in a decision of great historic significance, the Persian king Darius the Great decided that, despite successfully subduing the revolt, there remained the unfinished business of exacting punishment on Athens and Eretria for supporting the revolt. The Ionian Revolt had severely threatened the stability of Darius's empire, and the states of mainland Greece would continue to threaten that stability unless dealt with. Darius thus began to contemplate the complete conquest of Greece, beginning with the destruction of Athens and Eretria.

In the next two decades there would be two Persian invasions of Greece, including some of the most famous battles in history. During the first invasion, Thrace, Macedon and the Aegean islands were added to the Persian Empire, and Eretria was duly destroyed. However, the invasion ended in 490 BC with the decisive Athenian victory at the Battle of Marathon. Between the two invasions, Darius died, and responsibility for the war passed to his son Xerxes I. Xerxes then led the second invasion personally in 480 BC, taking an enormous (although oft-exaggerated) army and navy to Greece. Those Greeks who chose to resist (the 'Allies') were defeated in the twin battles of Thermopylae and Artemisium on land and at sea respectively. All of Greece except the Peloponnesus thus fell into Persian hands, but then seeking to finally destroy the Allied navy, the Persians suffered a decisive defeat at the Battle of Salamis. The following year, 479 BC, the Allies assembled the largest Greek army yet seen and defeated the Persian invasion force at the Battle of Plataea, ending the invasion and the threat to Greece.

According to tradition, on the same day as Plataea, the Allied fleet defeated the demoralised remnants of the Persian fleet in the Battle of Mycale. This action marks the end of the Persian invasion, and the beginning of the next phase in the Greco-Persian wars, the Greek counterattack. After Mycale, the Greek cities of Asia Minor again revolted, with the Persians now powerless to stop them. The Allied fleet then sailed to the Chersonesos, still held by the Persians, and besieged and captured the town of Sestos. The following year, 478 BC, the Allies sent a force to capture the city of Byzantium (modern day Istanbul). The siege was successful, but the behaviour of the Spartan general Pausanias alienated many of the Allies, and resulted in Pausanias's recall. The siege of Byzantium was the last action of the Hellenic alliance that defeated the Persian invasion.

Athens and her empire in 431 BC; the Athenian Empire was the direct descendant of the Delian League.

After Byzantium, Sparta was eager to end her involvement in the war. The Spartans were of the view that, with the liberation of mainland Greece, and the Greek cities of Asia Minor, the war's purpose had already been reached. There was also perhaps a feeling that securing long-term security for the Asian Greeks would prove impossible. The loose alliance of city states that fought against Xerxes's invasion was dominated by Sparta and the Peloponnesian league. With the Spartan withdrawal, the leadership of the Greeks now explicitly passed to the Athenians. A congress was called on the holy island of Delos to institute a new alliance to continue the fight against the Persians. This alliance, now including many of the Aegean islands, was formally constituted as the 'First Athenian Alliance', commonly known as the Delian League. According to Thucydides, the official aim of the League was to "avenge the wrongs they suffered by ravaging the territory of the king." Forces of the Delian League spent much of the next decade expelling the remaining Persian garrisons from Thrace, and expanding the Aegean territory controlled by the League.

== Prelude ==
Once the Persian forces in Europe had largely been neutralised, the Athenians seem to have gone about starting to extend the League in Asia Minor. The islands of Samos, Chios and Lesbos seem to have become members of the original Hellenic alliance after Mycale, and presumably were also therefore original members of the Delian League. However, it is unclear exactly when the other Ionian cities, or indeed the other Greek cities of Asia Minor, joined the league, though they certainly did at some point. Thucydides attests the presence of Ionians at Byzantium in 478 BC, so it is possible that at least some of the Ionian cities joined the league in early 478 BC. The Athenian politician Aristides was said to have died in Pontus (c. 468 BC) whilst on public business. Given that Aristides was responsible for organising the financial contributions of each League member, this trip may have been connected with expansion of the League into Asia Minor.

Cimon's Eurymedon campaign itself seems to have begun in response to the assembly of a large Persian fleet and army at Aspendos, near the mouth of the Eurymedon River. It is usually argued that the Persians were the would-be aggressors, and that Cimon's campaign was launched to deal with this new threat. Cawkwell suggests that the Persian build-up was the first concerted attempt to counter the activity of the Greeks since the failure of the second invasion. It is possible that internal strife within the Persian empire had contributed to the length of time it took to launch this campaign. Cawkwell outlines the Persian strategic problems:

"Persia was a land power which used its naval forces in close conjunction with its armies, not free ranging in enemy waters. In any case, secure naval bases were necessary. In the Ionian Revolt with land forces already operating in Ionia and elsewhere along the Aegean seaboard, it was easy for a Royal army and navy to deal with the revolt, but in view of the general revolt of the [Ionian] cities in 479 BC and the subsequent successes of the Greek navies the only way for Persia must have seemed to be to move along the coast restoring order in city after city, with fleet and army moving together."

The nature of naval warfare in the Ancient world, dependent as it was on large teams of rowers, meant that ships would have to make landfall every few days to resupply with food and water. This severely limited the range of an ancient fleet, and essentially meant that navies could only operate in the vicinity of secure naval bases. Cawkwell therefore suggests that the Persian forces gathered at Aspendos were aiming to move along the southern coast of Asia Minor, capturing each city, until eventually the Persian navy could begin operating in Ionia again. Alexander the Great would employ this strategy in reverse in winter of 333 BC. Lacking a navy with which to take on the Persians, Alexander settled instead for denying the Persian navy suitable bases, by capturing the ports of southern Asia Minor.

Plutarch says that upon hearing that the Persian forces were gathering at Aspendos, Cimon sailed from Cnidus (in Caria) with 200 triremes. It is highly likely that Cimon had assembled this force because the Athenians had had some warning of a forthcoming Persian campaign to re-subjugate the Asiatic Greeks. Certainly, no other league business would have required such a great force. Cimon may have been waiting in Caria because he expected the Persians to march straight into Ionia, along the Royal road from Sardis. According to Plutarch, Cimon sailed with these 200 triremes to the Greek city of Phaselis (in Lycia) but was refused admittance. He therefore began ravaging the lands of Phaselis, but with the mediation of the Chian contingent of his fleet, the people of Phaselis agreed to join the league. They were to contribute troops to the expedition, and to pay the Athenians ten talents. The fact that Cimon pre-emptively sailed to and captured Phaselis suggests that he anticipated a Persian campaign to capture the coastal cities (as outlined above). The presence of both army and navy at Aspendos may have persuaded him that there was to be no immediate assault on Ionia. By capturing Phaselis, the furthest east Greek city in Asia Minor (and just to the west of the Eurymedon), he effectively blocked the Persian campaign before it had begun, denying them the first naval base they needed to control. Taking further initiative, Cimon then moved to directly attack the Persian fleet at Aspendos.

== Opposing forces ==
=== Greek ===
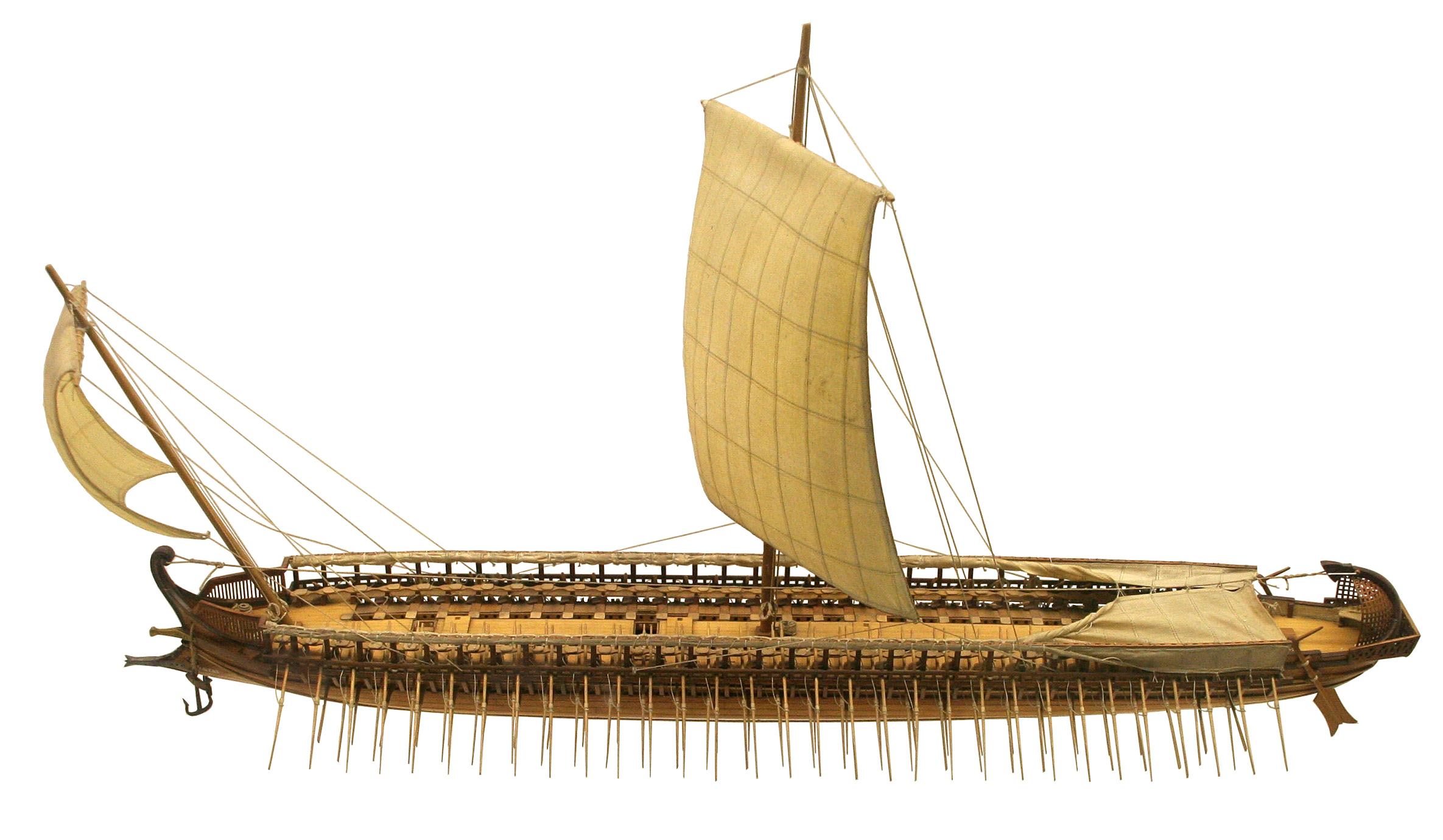
Reconstructed model of a trireme, the type of ship in use by both the Greek and Persian forces.

According to Plutarch, the League fleet consisted of 200 triremes. These were of the sleek Athenian aphract (deckless) design, originally developed by Themistocles primarily for ramming actions, although they had been modified by Cimon to improve their suitability for boarding actions.

The standard complement of a trireme was 200 men, including 14 marines. In the second Persian invasion of Greece, each Persian ship had carried thirty extra marines, and this was probably very true in the first invasion when the whole invasion force was apparently carried in triremes. Furthermore, the Chian ships at the Battle of Lade also carried 40 marines each. This suggests that a trireme could probably carry a maximum of 40–45 soldiers—triremes seem to have been easily destabilised by extra weight. There were therefore probably around 5,000 hoplite marines with the League fleet.

=== Persian ===
Several different estimates for the size of the Persian fleet are given. Thucydides says that there was a fleet of 200 Phoenician ships, and is generally considered the most reliable source. Plutarch gives numbers of 350 from Ephorus and 600 from Phanodemus. Furthermore, Plutarch says that the Persian fleet was awaiting 80 Phoenician ships sailing from Cyprus. Although Thucydides's account is generally to be favoured, there may an element of truth in Plutarch's assertion that the Persians were awaiting further reinforcements; this would explain why Cimon was able to launch a pre-emptive assault on them. There are no estimates in the ancient sources for the size of the Persian land army. However, the number of Persian marines accompanying the fleet was presumably in the same range as the number of Greek marines (c. 5,000), since the Persian ships carried the same complement of troops. Plutarch quotes Ephorus as saying that Tithraustes was commander of the royal fleet, and Pherendatis of the infantry, but says that Callisthenes named Ariomandes as overall commander.

== Battle ==
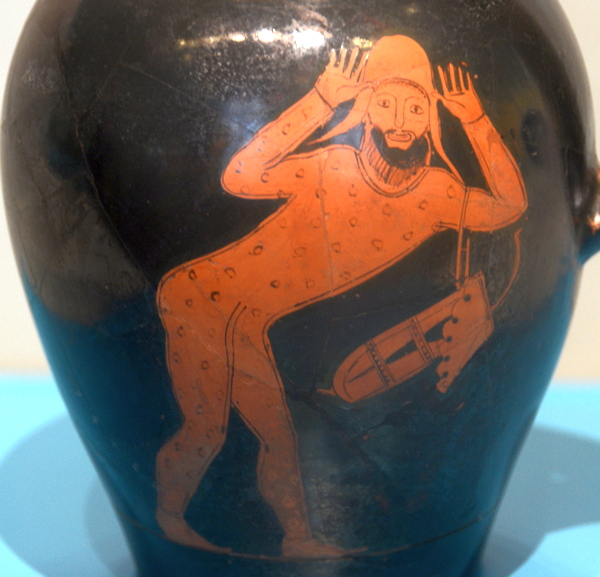
The Persian archer on the Eurymedon vase. On the reverse is a naked ithyphallic Greek warrior. An inscription on the vase states εύρυμέδον ειμ[í] κυβα[---] έστεκα "I am Eurymedon, I stand bent forward", in probable reference to the Persian defeat and humiliation at the Battle of the Eurymedon. Eurymedon vase, made circa 460 BC.

Thucydides gives only the barest of details for this battle; the most reliable detailed account is given by Plutarch. According to Plutarch, the Persian fleet was anchored off the mouth of the Eurymedon, awaiting the arrival of 80 Phoenician ships from Cyprus. Cimon, sailing from Phaselis, made to attack the Persians before the reinforcements arrived, whereupon the Persian fleet, eager to avoid fighting, retreated into the river itself. However, when Cimon continued to bear down on the Persians, they accepted battle. Regardless of their numbers, the Persian battle line was quickly breached, and the Persian ships then turned about, and made for the river bank. Grounding their ships, the crews sought sanctuary with the army waiting nearby. Some ships may have been captured or destroyed during the naval battle, but it seems likely that most were able to land.

The Persian army now began to move towards the Greek fleet, which had presumably also grounded itself in order to capture the Persian ships. Despite the weariness of his troops after this first battle, Cimon, seeing "that his men were exalted by the impetus and pride of their victory, and eager to come to close quarters with the Barbarians", landed the marines and proceeded to attack the Persian army. Initially the Persian line held the Athenian assault, but eventually, as at the Battle of Mycale, the heavily armoured hoplites proved superior, and routed the Persian army. Fleeing back to their camp, the Persians were then captured, along with their camp, by the victorious Greeks.

Thucydides says that 200 Phoenician ships were captured and destroyed. It is highly unlikely that this occurred during the apparently brief naval battle, so these were probably grounded ships captured after the battle and destroyed with fire, as has been the case at Mycale. Plutarch says that 200 ships were captured, in addition to those that were destroyed or fled. It is possible that 'destroyed' in this context means sunk during the battle, since the Greeks would almost certainly have destroyed the ships that they captured as well (as Thucydides indeed implies). Since Thucydides only explicitly gives the number of ships destroyed, it is possible to reconcile Plutarch's and Thucydides's numbers, but it is not clear that this is the best approach. There are no estimates in the ancient sources for casualties amongst the troops of either side.

Plutarch says that, following his double victory, "though like a powerful athlete he had brought down two contests in one day...Cimon still went on competing with his own victories." Cimon supposedly sailed with the Greek fleet as quickly as possible to intercept the fleet of 80 Phoenician ships the Persians had expected. Taking them by surprise, he captured or destroyed the entire fleet. However, Thucydides does not mention this subsidiary action, and some have cast doubt on whether it actually happened.

== Aftermath ==
According to Plutarch, one tradition had it that the Persian king (who at the time would still have been Xerxes) agreed a humiliating peace treaty in the aftermath of the Eurymedon. However, as Plutarch admits, other authors denied that such a peace was made at this time, and the more logical date for any peace treaty would have been after the Cyprus campaign of 450 BC. The alternative suggested by Plutarch is that the Persian king acted as if he had made a humiliating peace with the Greeks, because he was so fearful of engaging in battle with them again. It is generally considered unlikely by modern historians that a peace treaty was made in the aftermath of Eurymedon.

The Eurymedon was a highly significant victory for the Delian League, which probably ended once and for all the threat of another Persian invasion of Greece. It also seems to have prevented any Persian attempt to reconquer the Asiatic Greeks until at least 451 BC. The accession of further cities of Asia Minor to the Delian league, particularly from Caria, probably followed Cimon's campaign there.

Despite Cimon's massive victory, something of a stalemate developed between Persia and the League. The Greeks do not appear to have pressed their advantage home in a meaningful way. If the later date of 466 BC for the Eurymedon campaign is accepted, this might be because the revolt in Thasos meant that resources were diverted away from Asia Minor to prevent the Thasians seceding from the League. Conversely, as Plutarch suggests, the Persians adopted a very defensive strategy in the Aegean for the next decade and a half. The Persian fleet was effectively absent from the Aegean until 451 BC, and Greek ships were able to ply the coasts of Asia Minor with impunity. The next major Delian League campaign against the Persians would only occur in 460 BC, when the Athenians decided to support a revolt in the Egyptian satrapy of the Persian empire. This campaign would last 6 years, before eventually ending in disaster for the Greeks.

== Bibliography ==
=== Primary sources ===
- Herodotus, The Histories
- Thucydides, History of the Peloponnesian War
- Xenophon, Hellenica
- Diodorus Siculus, Biblioteca Historica
- Plutarch, Parallel Lives — Aristides, Cimon, Themistocles
- Ctesias, Persica (from Photios's Epitome)

=== Secondary sources ===
- Cawkwell, George (2005). The Greek Wars: The Failure of Persia. Oxford: Oxford University Press. ISBN 0-674-03314-0.
- Davidson, James N. (1997). Courtesans and Fishcakes: The Consuming Passions of Classical Athens. London: Harper Collins Publishers.
- Fine, John Van Antwerp (1983). The Ancient Greeks: A Critical History. Cambridge, MA: Harvard University Press. ISBN 0-674-03314-0.
- Finley, Moses (1972). "Introduction". Thucydides: History of the Peloponnesian War (translated by Rex Warner). New York, NY: Penguin Books. ISBN 0-14-044039-9.
- Gardiner, Robert, ed. (2004). The Age of the Galley: Mediterranean Oared Vessels since Pre-Classical Times. London: Conway Maritime Press. ISBN 978-0-85177-955-3.
- Goldsworthy, Adrian (2009). The Fall of Carthage. London: Phoenix. ISBN 978-0-304-36642-2.
- Green, Peter (2008). Alexander the Great and the Hellenistic Age. London: Phoenix. ISBN 978-0-7538-2413-9.
- Holland, Tom (2005). Persian Fire: The First World Empire and the Battle for the West. New York and London: Doubleday. ISBN 0-385-51311-9.
- Hooper, Finley (1978). Greek Realities: Life and Thought in Ancient Greece. Detroit, IL: Wayne State University Press. ISBN 0-8143-1597-6.
- Hornblower, Simon (2002) [1983]. The Greek World, 479–323 B.C. (Third ed.). London and New York: Routledge. ISBN 0-415-16326-9.
- Kagan, Donald (1989). The Outbreak of the Peloponnesian War. Ithaca, NY: Cornell University Press. ISBN 0-8014-9556-3.
- Lazenby, John Francis (1993). The Defence of Greece 490–479 BC. Liverpool: Liverpool University Press. ISBN 0-85668-591-7.
- Powell, Anton (1988). Athens and Sparta: Constructing Greek Political and Social History from 478 BC. London and New York: Routledge. ISBN 0-415-00338-5.
- Pryor, John H. (1988). Geography, Technology, and War: Studies in the Maritime History of the Mediterranean, 649–1571. Cambridge and New York: Cambridge University Press. ISBN 0-521-42892-0.
- Sealey, Raphael (1976). A History of the Greek City States, ca. 700–338 B.C. Berkeley, Los Angeles and London: University of California Press. ISBN 0-520-03177-6.
