= Pherendatis =

Achaemenid military leader (died 469 or 466 BC)

Pherendatis (died 469 or 466 BC) was an Achaemenid Persian general who was appointed Supreme Commander of the ground forces in the Battle of the Eurymedon. He perished in this battle.
