= Aeaces =

Aeaces (Ancient Greek: Aἰάκης) can refer to two ancient Samians:

- Aeaces (father of Polycrates), who may have ruled Samos in the mid-sixth century BC. His sons Polycrates and Syloson also ruled Samos.
- Aeaces (son of Syloson), grandson of the previous, who ruled Samos in the late sixth and early fifth centuries BC.
