= 497 BC =

497 BC in various calendars
Gregorian calendar	497 BC; CDXCVII BC
Ab urbe condita	257
Ancient Egypt era	XXVII dynasty, 29
Pharaoh	Darius I of Persia, 25
Ancient Greek Olympiad (summer)	70th Olympiad, year 4
Assyrian calendar	4254
Balinese saka calendar	N/A
Bengali calendar	−1090 – −1089
Berber calendar	454
Buddhist calendar	48
Burmese calendar	−1134
Byzantine calendar	5012–5013
Chinese calendar	癸卯年 (Water Rabbit); 2201 or 1994 — to — 甲辰年 (Wood Dragon); 2202 or 1995
Coptic calendar	−780 – −779
Discordian calendar	670
Ethiopian calendar	−504 – −503
Hebrew calendar	3264–3265
- Hindu calendars
Vikram Samvat	−440 – −439
Shaka Samvat	N/A
Kali Yuga	2604–2605
Holocene calendar	9504
Iranian calendar	1118 BP – 1117 BP
Islamic calendar	1152 BH – 1151 BH
Javanese calendar	N/A
Julian calendar	N/A
Korean calendar	1837
Minguo calendar	2408 before ROC 民前2408年
Nanakshahi calendar	−1964
Thai solar calendar	46–47
Tibetan calendar	ཆུ་མོ་ཡོས་ལོ་ (female Water-Hare) −370 or −751 or −1523 — to — ཤིང་ཕོ་འབྲུག་ལོ་ (male Wood-Dragon) −369 or −750 or −1522

Year 497 BC was a year of the pre-Julian Roman calendar. At the time, it was known as the Year of the Consulship of Atratinus and Augurinus (or, less frequently, year 257 Ab urbe condita). The denomination 497 BC for this year has been used since the early medieval period, when the Anno Domini calendar era became the prevalent method in Europe for naming years.

== Events ==
=== By place ===
==== Greece ====
- Artybius ends the rebellion in Cyprus.
- The Persians launch an expedition on the Hellespont and later Caria.

==== Rome ====
- December 17 – Consecration of the newly constructed Temple of Saturn in the Roman Forum, and Saturnalia festival first celebrated.

== Deaths ==
- Onesilus, King of Salamis
