= Syloson (son of Calliteles) =

Syloson, son of Calliteles (Ancient Greek: Συλοσὼν Καλλιτέλους) is a ruler of Samos, known only from a brief reference in the second century AD historian Polyaenus. He may have lived in the early sixth century BC or in the mid-fifth century BC.

According to Polyaenus, Syloson was a general of the Samians who was believed to have democratic leanings. During a war with an unspecified group of Aeolians, he encouraged the Samians to hold the traditional festival at the Heraion outside the city walls and then took advantage of their absence to seize control of the city for himself.

J. P. Barron argues that this event took place in the early sixth century BC and that the government overthrown by Syloson was the regime that had replaced the Geomori. He suggests that Syloson was the founder of a tyrannical dynasty which ruled Samos for most of the sixth century BC, being succeeded first by Aeaces and then by Polycrates. By contrast, Aideen Carty argues that Syloson's coup took place in 453 BC as part of the unrest leading to the Samian War from the Athenian empire. The story of Syloson's coup is very similar to the story that Herodotus tells about the seizure of power by Polycrates and his brother Syloson (sons of Aeaces). It is possible that Polyaenus is actually recounting a version of that story, in which Syloson has been given the wrong patronymic. In that case Syloson son of Calliteles would just be a doublet for Syloson son of Aeaces.

== Bibliography ==
- Barron, John P. (1964). "The Sixth-Century Tyranny at Samos". The Classical Quarterly. 14 (2): 210–229. doi:10.1017/S0009838800023764. JSTOR 637725.
- Shipley, Graham J. (1987). A History of Samos, 800-188 BC. Oxford: Oxford University Press. pp. 37–39. ISBN 9780198148685.
- Carty, Aideen (2015). Polycrates, Tyrant of Samos: New Light on Archaic Greece. Stuttgart: Franz Steiner Verlag. pp. 25–28. ISBN 9783515108980.
