= Arlissos =

Town of ancient Caria

Arlissos (Ancient Greek: Ἀρλισσός) was a town of ancient Caria. It was a member of the Delian League since it appears in tribute records of Athens in the year 445/4 BCE, where it paid a phoros of 600 drachmae. It also appears in a list of names in an inscription of Labraunda of the 4th century BCE. A herald of the city is cited in a treaty between Mylasa and Cindye of the 4th century BCE. It also appears from this decree that the native population of Anatolia probably abounded in the city, and the city's membership in the Greek world is debatable.

Its site is unlocated.
