= Pixodarus, son of Mausolus =

Dignitary of Caria circa 500 BCE, son of a man named Mausolus

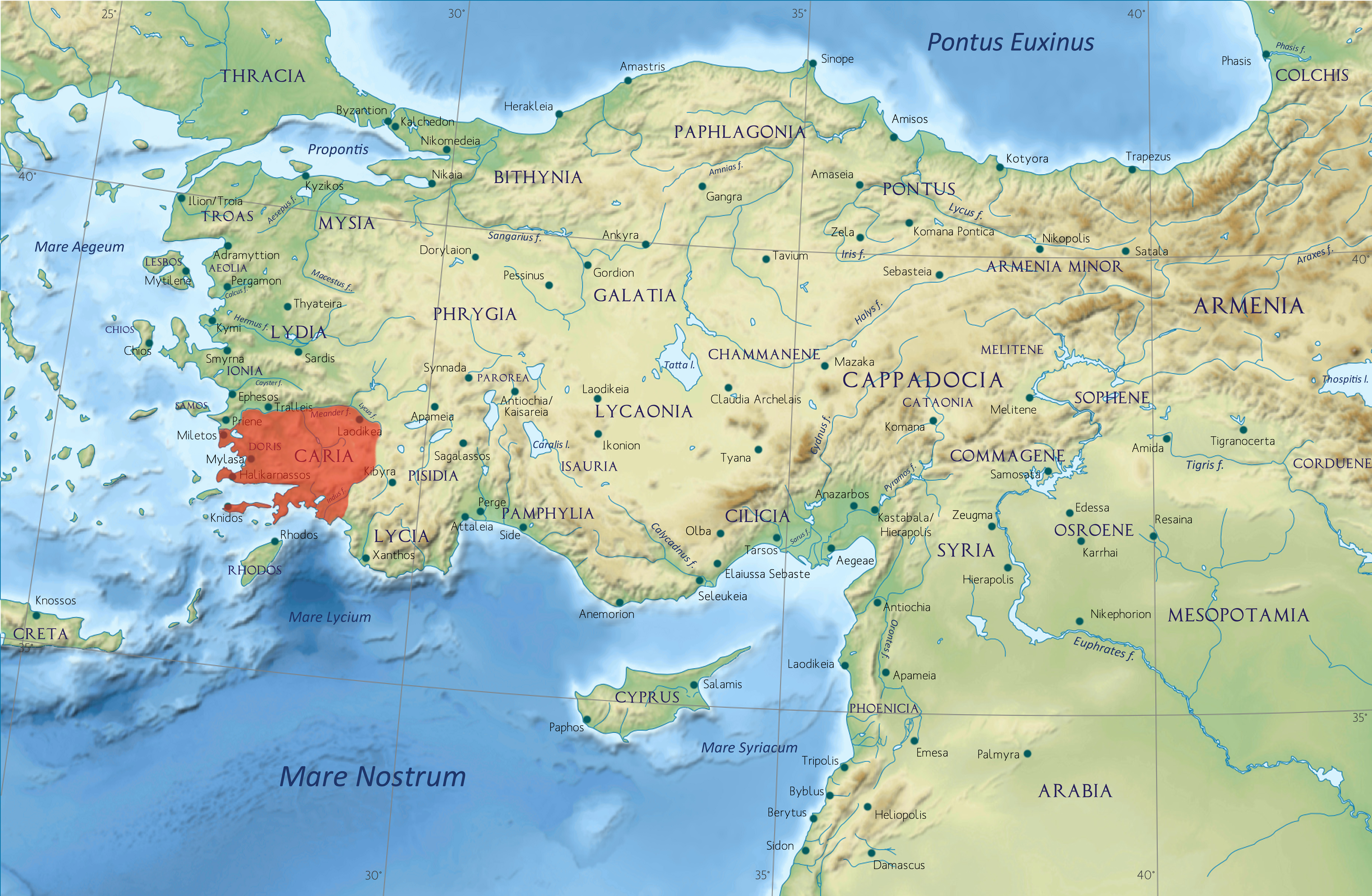
Location of Caria within the classical regions of Asia Minor/Anatolia

Pixodarus (Πιξώδαρος) was a dignitary of Caria circa 500 BCE, son of a man named Mausolus (not to be confused with the later ruler of Caria named Mausolus), who was from the city of Cindye. Pixodarus led the Carians fighting on the Ionian side during the Ionian revolt in 490 BCE, but was defeated twice by the Achaemenids (in the Battle of the Marsyas and the Battle of Labraunda in 495 BC).

He also married the daughter of Syennesis, ruler of Achaemenid Cilicia. Syennesis was a contemporary and tributary of Darius the Great, and possibly the same man whom Herodotus mentions as one of the most distinguished of the subordinate commanders in the fleet of Xerxes I.
