= Battle of Ephesus (498 BC) =

498 BC battle during the Ionian Revolt

Battle of Ephesos
- Part of the Ionian Revolt
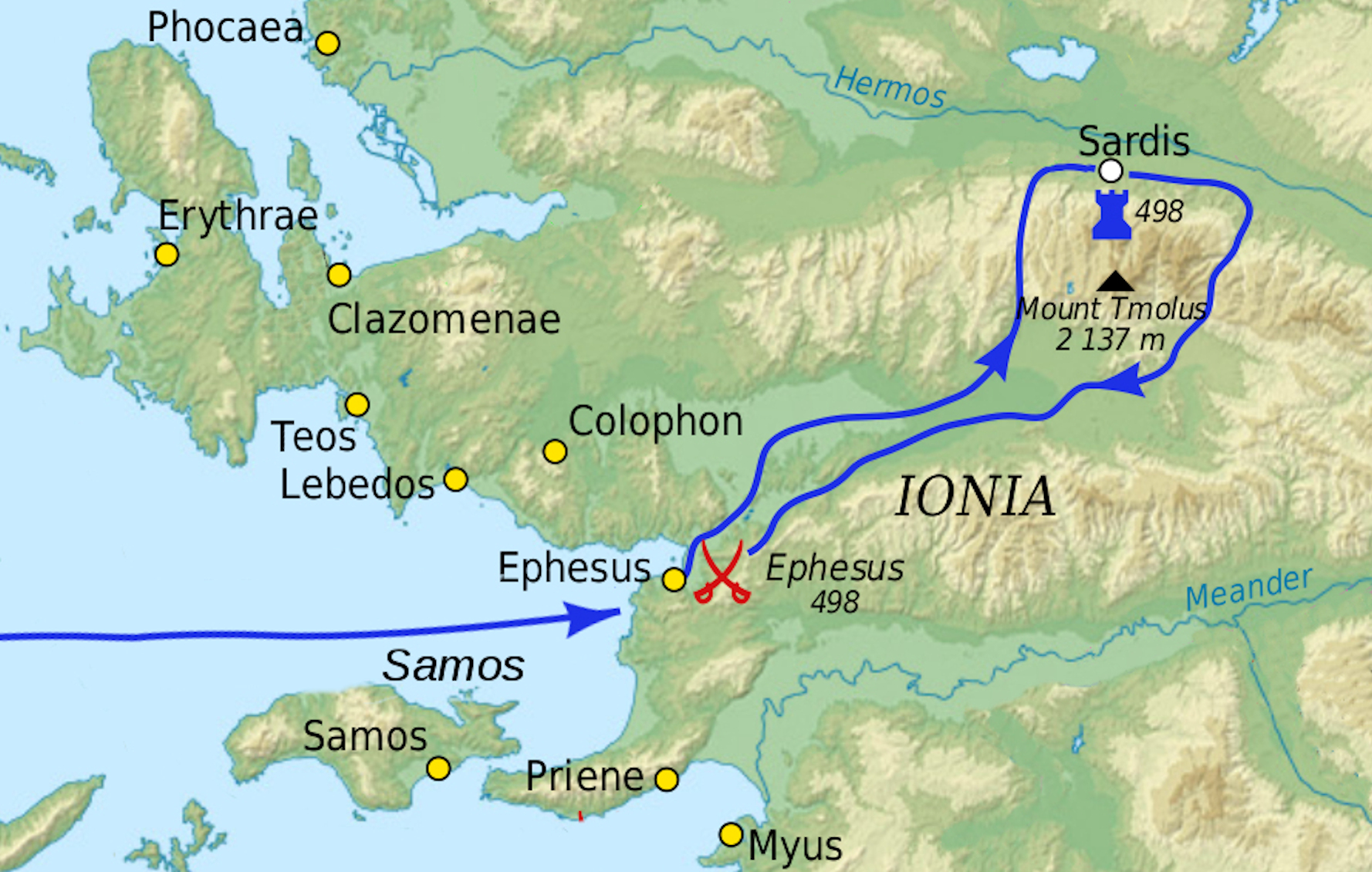
- Map showing the campaign leading up to the Battle of Ephesus
Date	c. 498 BC
Location	Ephesus (modern-day Selçuk, İzmir, Turkey)
Result	Persian victory

Belligerents
Achaemenid Empire	Ionia; Athens; Eretria

Commanders and leaders
Artaphernes	Charopinos; Hermophantos; Eualkides †

Strength
Unknown	Unknown

Casualties and losses
Unknown	Unknown, most likely higher

The Battle of Ephesus took place in 498 BC between Persian and Greek forces during the Ionian revolt. The Persians defeated the Greek army and compelled the Athenians and Eretrians to abandon their alliance with the Ionians.

== Background ==
The Ionian Revolt was triggered by the dissatisfaction of the Greek cities of Asia Minor with the tyrants appointed by Persia to rule them. In 499 BC, the then-tyrant of Miletus, Aristagoras, launched a joint expedition with the Persian satrap Artaphernes to conquer Naxos, in an attempt to bolster his position in Miletus. The mission was a debacle, and sensing his imminent removal as tyrant, Aristagoras chose to incite the whole of Ionia into rebellion against the Persian king Darius the Great. The Ionians also secured alliances with Athens and Eretria in mainland Greece and their combined forces met at Ephesus and prepared to go on the offensive. The Greek army, led by the generals Charopinus and Hermophantus, moved inland and besieged Artaphernes’ satrapal capital of Sardis, successfully capturing and burning (supposedly accidentally) the lower section of the city. However a counterattack from Persian troops in the citadel of the city forced the Greeks back and they decided to retreat to Ephesus. Herodotus says that when the Persians in Asia Minor heard of the attack on Sardis, they gathered together, and marched to the relief of Artaphernes. When they arrived at Sardis, they found the Greeks recently departed. So they followed their tracks back towards Ephesus. They caught up with the Greeks outside Ephesus and the Greeks were forced to turn and prepare to fight.

== Battle ==
Holland suggests that the Persians were primarily cavalry (hence their ability to catch up with the Greeks). The typical Persian cavalry of the time were probably missile cavalry, whose tactics were to wear down a static enemy with volley after volley of arrows.

It is clear that the demoralised and tired Greeks were no match for the Persians, and were completely routed in the battle which ensued at Ephesus. Many were killed, including the Eretrian general, Eualcides. The Ionians who escaped the battle made for their own cities, while the remaining Athenians and Eretrians managed to return to their ships and sailed back to Greece.

== Aftermath ==
The Athenians now ended their alliance with the Ionians, since the Persians had proved to be anything but the easy prey that Aristagoras had described. However, the Ionians remained committed to their rebellion and the Persians did not seem to follow up their victory at Ephesus. Presumably these ad hoc forces were not equipped to lay siege to any of the cities. Despite the defeat at Ephesus, the revolt actually spread further. The Ionians sent men to the Hellespont and Propontis and captured Byzantium and the other nearby cities. They also persuaded the Carians to join the rebellion. Furthermore, seeing the spread of the rebellion, the kingdoms of Cyprus also revolted against Persian rule without any outside persuasion. Thus the Battle of Ephesus did not have a major effect on the revolt.
