= Aristocyprus =

5th-century BC king of Soli, Cyprus

Aristocyprus (Ancient Greek: Ἀριστόκυπρος) was a king of ancient Greece who ruled over Soli in Cyprus. He is primarily known to us from the works of the historian Herodotus. His father was Philocyprus, whom we know Solon had once visited and praised in poetry at some point.

In 497 BCE, Soli under Aristocyprus joined the Ionian Revolt, rebelling against rule over Cyprus by the Achaemenid Empire (whom Herodotus called "Persians") under Darius the Great. Aristocyprus would not survive the conflict, and he fell in battle with the Achaemenids that same year. His name means "the best of Cyprus" and he is positioned in the narrative as the most noble among those around him. Herodotus tells us that while other leaders around him deserted or were cut down fleeing, Aristocyprus died fighting. Soli itself resisted fiercely but fell after a five-month siege.
