= Onesilus =

King of Salamis, Cyprus (died 497 BC)

Onesilus or Onesilos (Greek: Ὀνήσιλος, "useful one"; died 497 BC) was the brother of King Gorgus of the Greek city-state of Salamis on the island of Cyprus. He is known only through the work of Herodotus (Histories, V.104–115).

== Background ==
Cyprus was a part of the Persian Empire, but, when the Ionians rebelled from Persian rule, Onesilus captured the city of Salamis and usurped his brother's throne. He won over every city on the island except for the Graeco-Phoenician city-state of Amathus, which stayed loyal to the Persians despite being besieged by Onesilus's troops.

In 497 BC, the Persians mounted an attack on Cyprus with the help of the Phoenician navy. Some of the Ionian colonies sent ships to assist Onesilus, and in the ensuing battle they were able to defeat the Phoenician navy. Onesilus then led an army against the Persian general, Artybius. Although Artybius died in the battle, the Persians were victorious and Onesilus was killed. As a result, the Ionian fleet retreated from Cyprus and five months later the Persians regained control of the island. Onesilus's brother, Gorgus Chersides, was then reinstated by the Persians as king of Salamis.

Herodotus also reports that in retaliation for Onesilus's siege of Amathus, the townspeople cut off his head after his death and hung it above the town gates as a trophy, and later observed that his desiccated skull had been occupied by a swarm of bees and their honeycomb (a phenomenon similar to bugonia). To ward off the effects of this ill omen they were advised to take down the head and bury it, making sacrifice to Onesilus as a hero.

== In popular culture ==
The story of the bees in the skull is the subject of "histories: onesilos", a poem by German poet Jan Wagner.

| Preceded by Gorgus | King of Salamis; 499–497 BC | Succeeded by Gorgus |
