= Artybius =

Ancient Persian general around the 5th or 6th century BCE

Artybius (Ancient Greek: Ἀρτύβιος) was a general of ancient Persia during the reign of Darius the Great (that is, around the 5th or 6th centuries BCE). After the Ionian Revolt had broken out, he sailed with a fleet to Cyprus to conquer that island.

In 497 BCE, the general Onesilus of Salamis, the head among the chiefs of Cyprus, asked to face Artybius in combat. Artybius accepted the offer, and rode out on his horse to face Onesilus and his attendant, who were on foot. The historian Herodotus relates an anecdote that Onesilus believed Artybius to have trained his horse to rear up and attack on command, and, after discussion with his attendant, when Artybius's horse did in fact make such an attack, Onesilus engaged Artybius and then he (or his attendant) chopped off the rearing horse's leg with his sickle. The horse fell on top of Artybius, allowing him to be slain easily.
