= Eualcides =

Greek athlete and military commander (died 498 BCE)

- Ευαλκίδης
- Died: 498 BCE; Ephesus
- Military career
- Allegiance: Eretria
- Rank: Strategos
- Conflicts: Battle of Ephesus †

Eualcides (Ancient Greek: Εὐαλκίδης) (d. 498 BCE) was a Greek athlete and military commander from Eretria who was killed by the Persians during the Battle of Ephesus.

He competed in the Olympics. The poet Simonides of Ceos composed an ode in celebration of his successes.
