= Aeaces (father of Polycrates) =

Aeaces (Ancient Greek: Αἰάκης, fl. 550 BC) was the father of Polycrates, the powerful tyrant of Samos. He was a prominent aristocrat in his own right, and may even have been the ruler of the island for a period in the mid-sixth century. He is sometimes referred to as Aeaces I to distinguish him from his grandson Aeaces II, who ruled Samos in the late sixth and early fifth centuries BC.

== Life ==
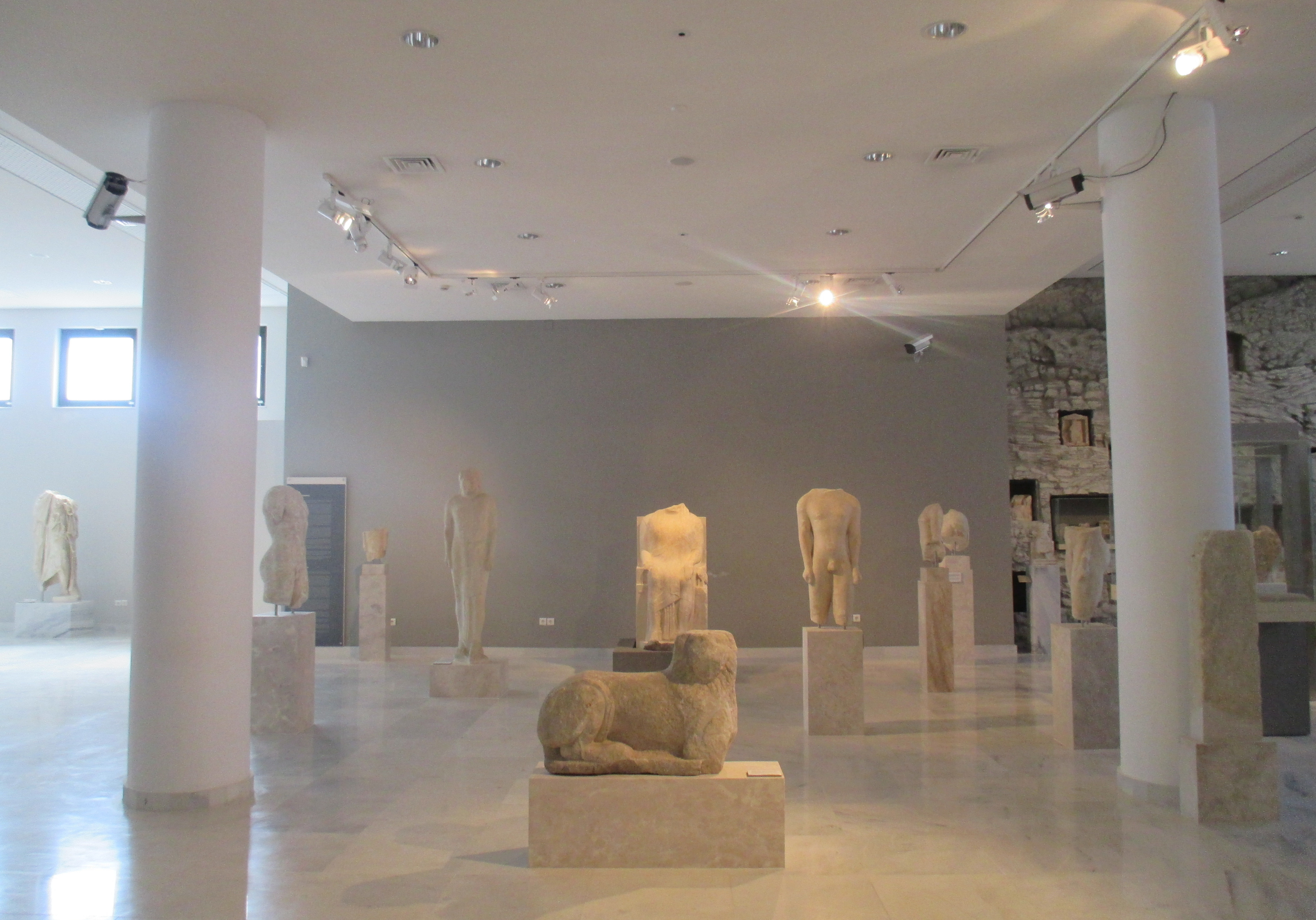
Seated statue of Aeaces (centre), in the Archaeological Museum of Samos.

Herodotus mentions Aeaces' name but does not provide any information about his life. A very late source, the Suda, says that Polycrates' father was the ruler of Samos around 565 BC. His wealth and power is also suggested by his ability to attract the poets Ibycus and Anacreon to his circle – the former wrote poetry for the young Polycrates, while the latter was supposedly his tutor.

A large seated statue of a goddess from the mid-sixth century BC, erected on the Astypalaea (the Samian Acropolis) bears an inscription identifying its dedicator as Aeaces. Stylistically, the statue appears to date to around 540 BC, while the inscription appears to be later (c. 500 BC). The inscription says:

Αἐάκης ἀνέθηκεν
ὁ Βρύχωνος ⋮ ὃς τῆι
Ἥρηι ⋮ τὴν σύλην ⋮ ἔ-
πρησεν ⋮ κατὰ τὴν
ἐπίστασιν.

Aeaces dedicated this,
the son of Brychon, he
seized (or burnt)
the booty for Hera,
during his period of command

— IG XII.6.ii.561

This Aeaces is generally identified with the father of Polycrates, despite the date of the inscription. M. White suggests that inscription made by Aeaces II in order to emphasise his hereditary right to rule. The statue seems to have been erected using the proceeds from captured booty (although other interpretations are possible). This might indicate that the powerful Samian thalassocracy of Polycrates had its roots in the time of Aeaces. It is not clear whether the inscription reveals Aeaces as the sole ruler of Samos (as his son would later be), or as just one powerful man among many. A bronze pot dedicated at the Heraion c. 575–550 BC has an inscription identifying its dedicator as Brychon, son of Timoleos. This might be Aeaces' father.

Aeaces' period of greatest prominence overlaps with a phase of great prosperity on Samos. The period witnessed the monumentalisation of the Heraion sanctuary, including the construction of the Rhoikos temple – the first of the great Ionian temples and the largest Greek temple built up to that time. If Aeaces was ruler of Samos, his son Polycrates did not inherit the position directly. Herodotus tells us that he seized control around 540 BC by means of a coup.

== Bibliography ==
- White, Mary (1954). "The Duration of the Samian Tyranny". Journal of the Hellenic Society. 74: 36–43. doi:10.2307/627553. JSTOR 627553.
- Labarbe, Jules (1962). "Un Decalage de 40 ans dans la chronologie de Polycrate". L'Antiquité Classique. 31: 153–88. doi:10.3406/antiq.1962.3658.
- Barron, John P. (1964). "The Sixth-Century Tyranny at Samos". The Classical Quarterly. 14 (2): 210–229. doi:10.1017/S0009838800023764. JSTOR 637725.
- Schmidt, G. (1974). "Eine Brychon-Weihung und ihre Fundlage". Mitteilungen des Deutschen archäologischen Instituts zu Athen. 87: 165–185.
- Shipley, Graham J. (1987). A History of Samos, 800–188 BC. Oxford: Oxford University Press. pp. 71–72. ISBN 9780198148685.
- Carty, Aideen (2015). Polycrates, Tyrant of Samos: New Light on Archaic Greece. Stuttgart: Franz Steiner Verlag. pp. 49–66. ISBN 9783515108980.
