= Cindye =

Ancient Greek city

Coordinates: 37°11′30″N 27°39′00″E

Cindye or Kindye (Ancient Greek: Κίνδυη) was a town of ancient Caria, near Bargylia.

Herodotus notes Cindye as the hometown of Pixodarus, son of Mausolos, who was married to the daughter of the king of the Cilician's, Syennesis. He proposed that they should fight against the Persians so that they had the Maeander River behind them, so that by not being able to flee, they would be forced to fight with greater courage than usual. However, his proposal was rejected.

Cindye was a member of the Delian League since it appears in tribute records of Athens between the years 453 and 440 BCE.

Strabo states that it was near Bargylia, and had a temple of Artemis Cindyeade but in his time Cindye no longer existed. Polybius also mentions this temple of Artemis saying that, although the image of the goddess was in the open air, there was a belief among some that it never got wet even if it rained or snowed.

Its site is located near Sırtmaç, Asiatic Turkey.
