= Polycrates =

6th-century BC tyrant of Samos

- Tyrant of Samos
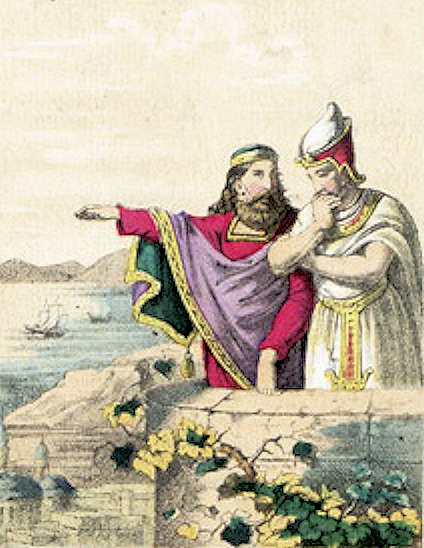
- Polycrates with Pharaoh Amasis II (19th century illustration).
- Reign: 540s – 522 BC
- Predecessor: Aeaces I?
- Successor: Maeandrus
- Born: Samos
- Died: 522 BC; Magnesia, Achaemenid Empire
Names
- Πολυκράτης Αἰάκου Σαμαῖος
- House: Aeacids
- Father: Aeaces I

Polycrates (/pəˈlɪkrəˌtiːz/; Ancient Greek: Πολυκράτης), son of Aeaces, was the tyrant of Samos from the 540s BC to 522 BC. He had a reputation as both a fierce warrior and an enlightened tyrant.

== Sources ==
The main source for Polycrates' life and activities is the historian Herodotus, who devotes a large section of book 3 of his Histories to the rise and fall of Polycrates (3.39-60, 3.120-126). His account was written in the third quarter of the 5th century BC, nearly a century after Polycrates' death, was based mostly on oral traditions and incorporates many folk-tale elements. Furthermore, Herodotus creatively shaped his account of Polycrates in order to make general moral points and to comment on the imperialism of the Athenian empire in his own day. Some poetry from Polycrates' time comments on him in passing and there is a smattering of references to Polycrates in other literary sources ranging in date from the 4th century BC to the Roman Imperial period. These sources preserve useful information but tend to assimilate Polycrates to a stereotypical model of the tyrannical ruler, which may be anachronistic.

== Family ==
Polycrates' family background is not clearly known to us. J.P. Barron proposed that Polycrates' ancestors formed a dynasty that ruled Samos from around 600 BC. A shadowy figure, Syloson, son of Calliteles might have been the founder of this dynasty. Barron further proposed that Polycrates' father, Aeaces, ruled Samos around the middle of the sixth century. An inscription survives from this period, in which an individual called Aeaces dedicates some plunder to Hera. Barron's analysis was broadly accepted by Graham Shipley, but has been challenged by Aideen Carty.

Polycrates had two brothers, Pantagnotus and Syloson, who were originally his co-rulers. Syloson ruled Samos again after Polycrates' death, and was succeeded by his own son, Aeaces. Herodotus mentions a daughter in his account of Polycrates' death.

== Reign ==
=== Establishment of his power ===
In the mid-sixth century BCE, there was apparently a period of civil strife in Samos. This conflict is mentioned by Herodotus in the context of Polycrates' rise to power. John Boardman and Graham Shipley have cited archaeological evidence for serious disruption in this period. Around 550 BC, they say, funerary stele were shattered and aristocratic burials in the West Cemetery at Samos cease, while the first great temple of Hera, known as the Rhoikos temple, was destroyed - only a decade after it was built. However, more recent archaeological research has challenged this picture, showing that the destruction of the Rhoikos temple was a structural failure resulting from subsidence under the foundations, and that the West Cemetery fell out of use gradually over the course of the second half of the sixth century. Aideen Carty argues that shifts in the deposition of Laconian pottery on Samos suggest the development of pro- and anti-Spartan factions on the island, one faction associated with the Heraion and the other with the Artemision of Samos.

Herodotus reports that Polycrates took power with his brothers Pantagnotus and Syloson and a force of only fifteen men. This coup seems to have taken place in 540 BC or slightly earlier. Initially, Polycrates ruled along with his brothers, but soon had Pantagnotus killed and then exiled Syloson to take full control for himself. According to a Roman-period author, Polyaenus, there was a religious procession in armour out of the city of Samos to the Heraion, led by Pantagnotus and Syloson. When the procession was over, the Samians removed their armour to sacrifice, and Pantagnotus and Syloson seized the chance to murder their enemies. At the same time, Polycrates seized Astypalaea, the citadel of the city of Samos. The tyrant of Naxos, Lygdamis, invaded with a force to support Polycrates. However, it is uncertain whether Polyaenus' account describes Polycrates' initial seizure of power or the conflict with his brothers which left him as sole ruler.

=== Thalassocracy ===
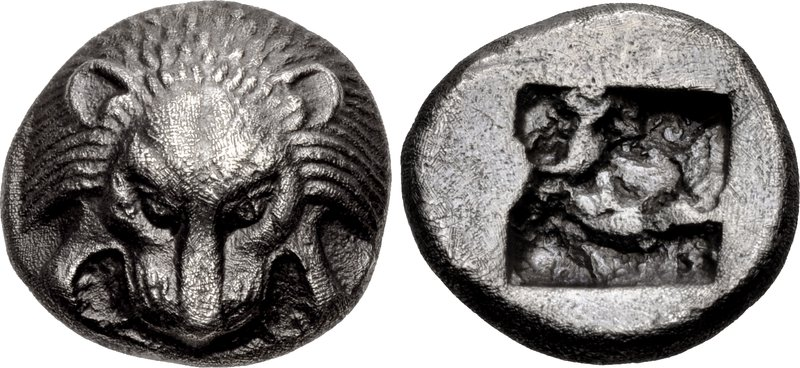
Coinage of Samos at the time of Polycrates. Circa 530-528 BC.

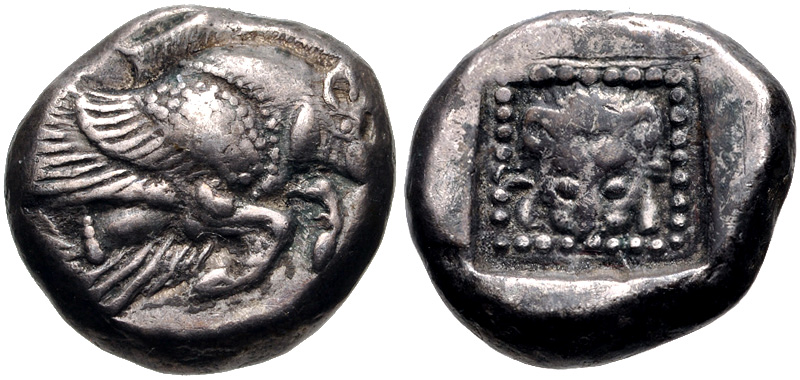
Coinage of Samos at the time of Polycrates. Forepart of winged boar with lion scalp facing in dotted square within incuse square. Circa 526-522 BC.

Polycrates recruited an army of 1,000 archers and assembled a navy of 100 penteconters, which became the most powerful navy in the Greek world –– Herodotus says that Polycrates was the first Greek ruler to understand the importance of sea power and Thucydides includes him in his list of thalassocracies in the Aegean. With these forces he implemented a plan to bring all the Greek islands and cities of Ionia under his rule. Polycrates' rise to power took place in the period when the Achaemenid Empire under Cyrus conquered western Anatolia. In theory, the Aegean islanders had accepted Persian overlordship after Cyrus conquered Lydia in 546 BC, but in practice the political situation in the Aegean was complicated. This confusion may have contributed to Polycrates' success in projecting his power.

Few specifics of Polycrates' naval activities and conquests are preserved. Herodotus refers to an attack on Miletus, in which the Lesbians came to the aid of Miletos and Polycrates won a great naval victory, capturing and enslaving large numbers of Lesbian sailors. The Milesians had become key Persian allies and this victory is probably identical with a victory over Persian navy mentioned in Thucydides and some other historians. Thucydides emphasises his conquest of Delos, the key religious centre of the Aegean. Polycrates formed an alliance with King Amasis of Egypt and A. Carty suggests that Polycrates assisted Amasis in the conquest of Cyprus. In general, though, the ancient sources stress not specific campaigns, but wide-ranging raiding, which may have been more like piracy than campaigns of conquest. Herodotus says that he "raided everyone without any discrimination. For he said that a friend would be more appreciative if what was taken from him was returned than if it had not first been snatched away." Aideen Carty argues that the focus of this raiding was the acquisition of slaves whom he exported to Egypt to serve as mercenaries in Amasis' army.

The nature of Polycrates' navy is debated. Some scholars have conceived of his penteconters as powerful warships in a state navy which owned, crewed and operated them in accordance with Polycrates' command. Other scholars consider this picture anachronistic; they present the penteconters as trading and raiding vessels that were owned privately by individual Samian aristocrats, who were essentially autonomous pirates only loosely constrained by Polycrates and the Samian state. In addition to these ships, Polycrates is said to have commissioned a new type of ship called the Samaina, a decked ship with two banks of oars, apparently a merchant galley designed for the rapid transport of goods or troops.

=== Rebellion and Spartan attack ===
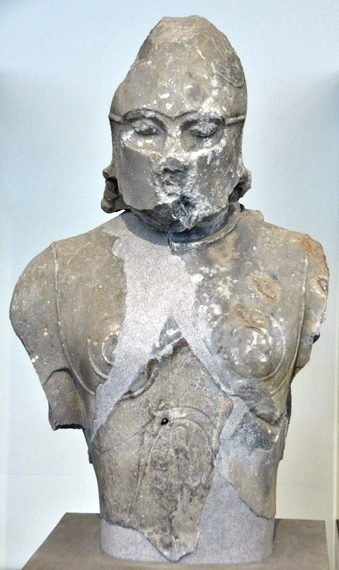
Samos, Temple of Hera, Statue of a warrior, 530 BC

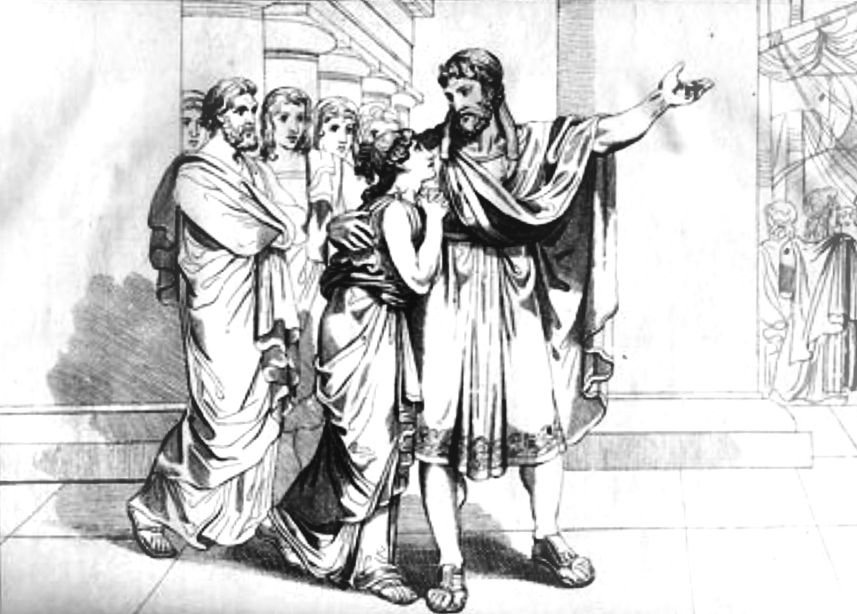
Polycrates leaving his daughter to encounter Oroetus.

Herodotus states that Polycrates later established a fleet of 40 triremes, probably becoming the first Greek state with a fleet of such ships, which he crewed with sailors he considered to be politically dangerous, and sent to the Persian king Cambyses with instructions to put the crews to death. Modern scholars consider this story unlikely. The dispatch of these ships is usually connected with the Persian invasion of Egypt in 525 BC. Herman Wallinga argues that the ships were built at Amasis' expense, crewed by Polycrates, and sent by him to fight against the Persians. By contrast, Hans Van Wees thinks that this fleet was a gift from the Persians, crewed by Polycrates, in order to assist the Persians against Amasis.

The naval detachment turned back to attack Polycrates. They defeated him at sea but could not take the island. The rebels then sailed to mainland Greece and allied with Sparta and Corinth. Sparta and Corinth invaded the island of Samos in support of the Samian rebels around 520 BC. After 40 days they withdrew their unsuccessful siege.

"It's said that Polycrates was one of the earliest known coin counterfeiters. Herodotus wrote that Polycrates bought off the besieging Spartans in 525/4 B.C. with counterfeit Samian coins. Some of these fakes still exist and are described in Spink's coin catalogue."

=== Persian invasion and death ===
Herodotus also tells the story of Polycrates' death. Near the end of the reign of Cambyses (around 522 BC), the satrap of Sardis, Oroetes, planned to kill Polycrates, either because he had been unable to add Samos to Persia's territory, or because Polycrates had snubbed a Persian ambassador. Prior to this, according to Diodorus Siculus, some Lydians fleeing Oroestes' domineering rule sought sanctuary on Samos. Polycrates at first received them, but then put them to the sword and confiscated the possessions that they had brought (Diodorus Siculus, Library 10.16.4). Polycrates was invited to Magnesia, where Oroetes lived. Oroetes claimed that he wanted a promise of refuge on Samos in the event that Cambyses turned on him and that in return he would give Polycrates a large amount of money. Polycrates was convinced and went to Magnesia, where he was assassinated. Herodotus is vague about the manner of Polycrates' death, saying only that it was an undignified end for a glorious ruler; he may have been impaled and his dead body was crucified. Herodotus claims that Polycrates' daughter warned him not to go to Magnesia, reporting a prophetic dream that she had had of him hanging in the air, being washed by Zeus and anointed by the sun god Helios. His death fulfilled this prophecy as when it rained he was 'washed by Zeus' and when the sun shone he was 'anointed by Helios', as the moisture was sweated from him.

After the murder of Polycrates by Oroetes, Samos was ruled by Maeandrius. After some time, Syloson, the brother of Polycrates, was installed as governor of Samos by Achaemenid ruler Darius I, receiving the help of general Otanes to expel the impostor who had taken control after Oroetes.

== Samos under Polycrates ==
=== Construction projects ===
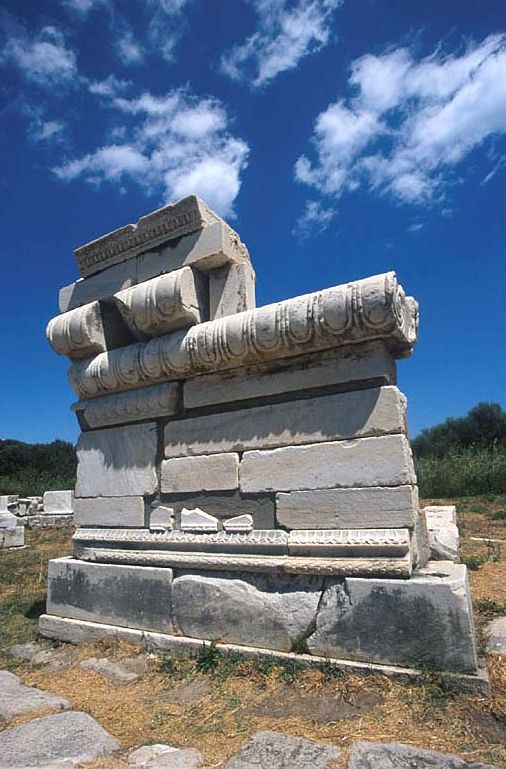
Heraion, Samos

Under Polycrates the Samians developed an engineering and technological expertise to a level unusual in ancient Greece. In the midst of his account of Polycrates, Herodotus presents three astounding engineering works of the Samians. The first of these is an aqueduct in the form of a tunnel 1,036 metres (3,399 ft) long which can still be seen and which is known as the Tunnel of Eupalinos. The tunnel was constructed by two teams tunnelling from opposite sides of a ridge who met in the middle with an error of only a few metres — a remarkable engineering feat for the time, and one which probably reflects the practical geometry skills which the Samians had learned from the Egyptians. Polycrates also sponsored construction of a large temple of Hera, the Heraion, to which Amasis dedicated many gifts, and which at 346 feet (105 m) long was one of the three largest temples in the Greek world, and he upgraded the harbour of his capital city (modern Pythagorion), ordering the construction of a deep-water mole nearly a quarter mile long, which is still used to shelter Greek fishing boats today. Although these projects are often associated with Polycrates on the strength of the passage of Herodotus, he is actually very vague about when these projects were carried out and what - if anything - they had to do with Polycrates. Archaeological work has made the picture more complicated, suggesting that the Tunnel of Eupalinos may have been dug before his reign and that Polycrates continued projects that were already in course at the Heraion.

=== Religious and cultural activities ===
One use to which Polycrates put his powerful navy was controlling the island of Delos, one of the most important religious centres in Greece, control of which would bolster Polycrates' claim to be the leader of the Ionian Greeks. Thucydides reports that Polycrates chained Delos to the neighbouring island of Rhenaia. In 522 BC Polycrates celebrated an unusual double festival in honour of the god Apollo of Delos and of Delphi; it has been suggested that the Homeric Hymn to Apollo, sometimes attributed to Cynaethus of Chios, was composed for this occasion.

Polycrates lived amid great luxury and spectacle and was a patron of the poets Anacreon and Ibycus. The philosopher Pythagoras was also on Samos during his reign but left for Croton about 531 BC, perhaps out of dissatisfaction with his tyranny. He also attracted to his court, sometimes by offering generous subsidies, an array of prominent craftsmen and professionals from throughout the Greek world, including Eupalinos, the architect of the Tunnel, who was originally from Megara, the famous physician Demodocus of Croton, Rhoikos the architect of the Heraion, and the master metal-worker Theodoros, who had made a famous silver bowl which Croesus dedicated at Delphi and which is described by Herodotus, and who also made the ring which was Polycrates' most treasured personal possession. Polycrates established a library on Samos, and showed a sophisticated approach to economic development, importing improved breeds of sheep, goats, and dogs from elsewhere in the Greek world.

== Polycrates' ring ==
=== In legend ===
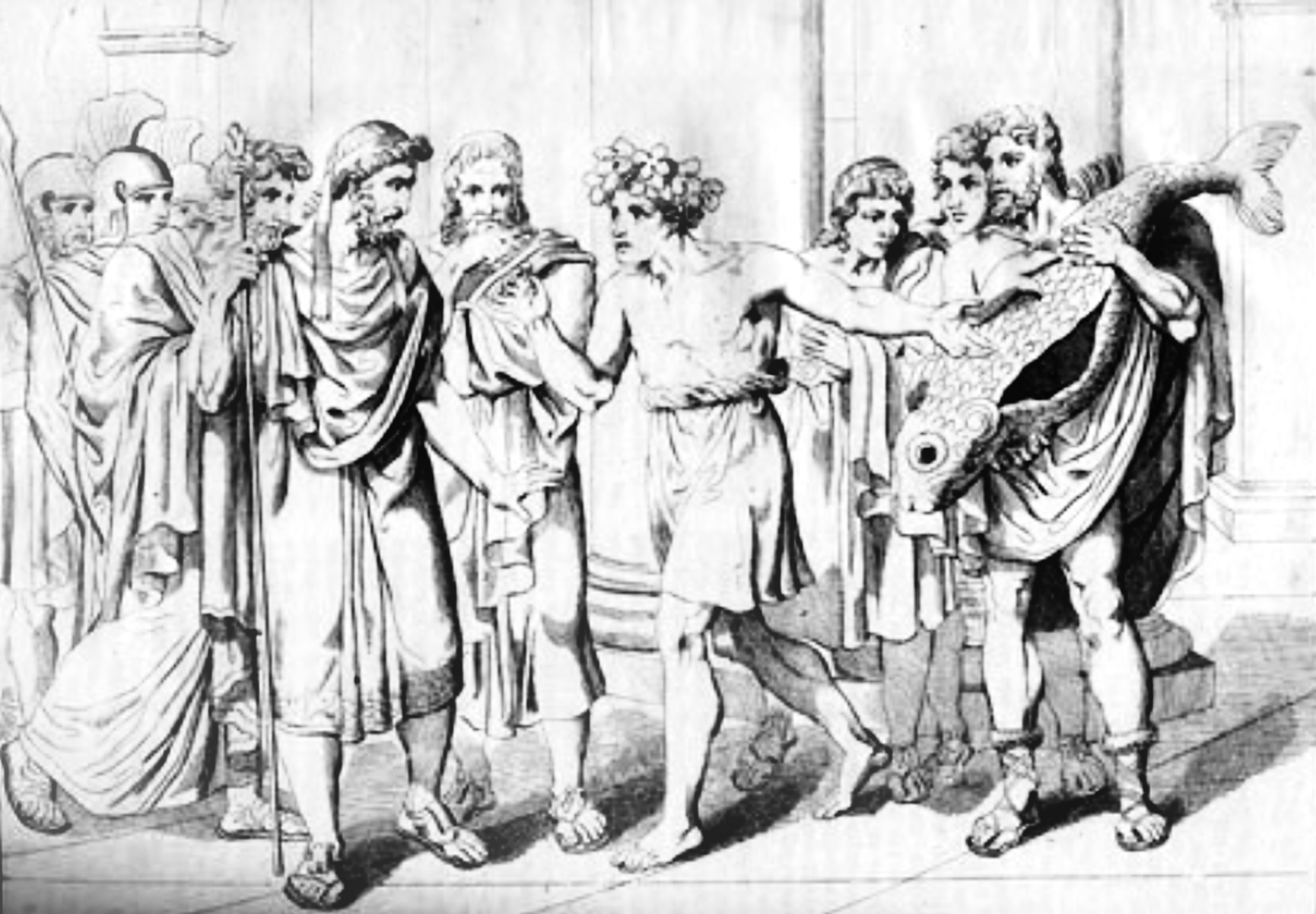
The ring of Polycrates is found inside a fish.

According to Herodotus, Amasis thought Polycrates was too successful, and advised him to throw away whatever he valued most in order to escape a reversal of fortune. Polycrates followed the advice and threw a jewel-encrusted ring into the sea; however, a few days later, a fisherman caught a large fish that he wished to share with the tyrant. While Polycrates' cooks were preparing the fish for eating, they discovered the ring inside of it. Polycrates told Amasis of his good fortune, and Amasis immediately broke off their alliance, believing that such a lucky man would eventually come to a disastrous end. Within Herodotus' work, this story serves to advance general themes about the mutability of fortune and how to judge success. Most subsequent references to Polycrates in literature and other media have focused on this story.

=== Cultural legacy ===
Polycrates' Ring (German: Der Ring des Polykrates) is a lyrical ballad written in June 1797 by Friedrich Schiller and first published in his 1798 Musen-Almanach annual. It is about how the greatest success gives reason to fear disaster.

The early 20th century opera Der Ring des Polykrates by Erich Wolfgang Korngold retells the story of Polycrates as a modern fable.

Polycrates is mentioned in Byron's famous stanzas "The Isles of Greece:"

Fill high the bowl with Samian wine!
We will not think of themes like these!
It made Anacreon's song divine:
He served—but served Polycrates—
A tyrant; but our masters then
Were still, at least, our countrymen.

In modern folkloristics, the tale of Polycrates' Ring originated the Aarne–Thompson–Uther tale type ATU 736A, named after this episode. The story is acknowledged by scholarship as "widespread" and "attested in numerous literatures and languages".

== Gallery ==
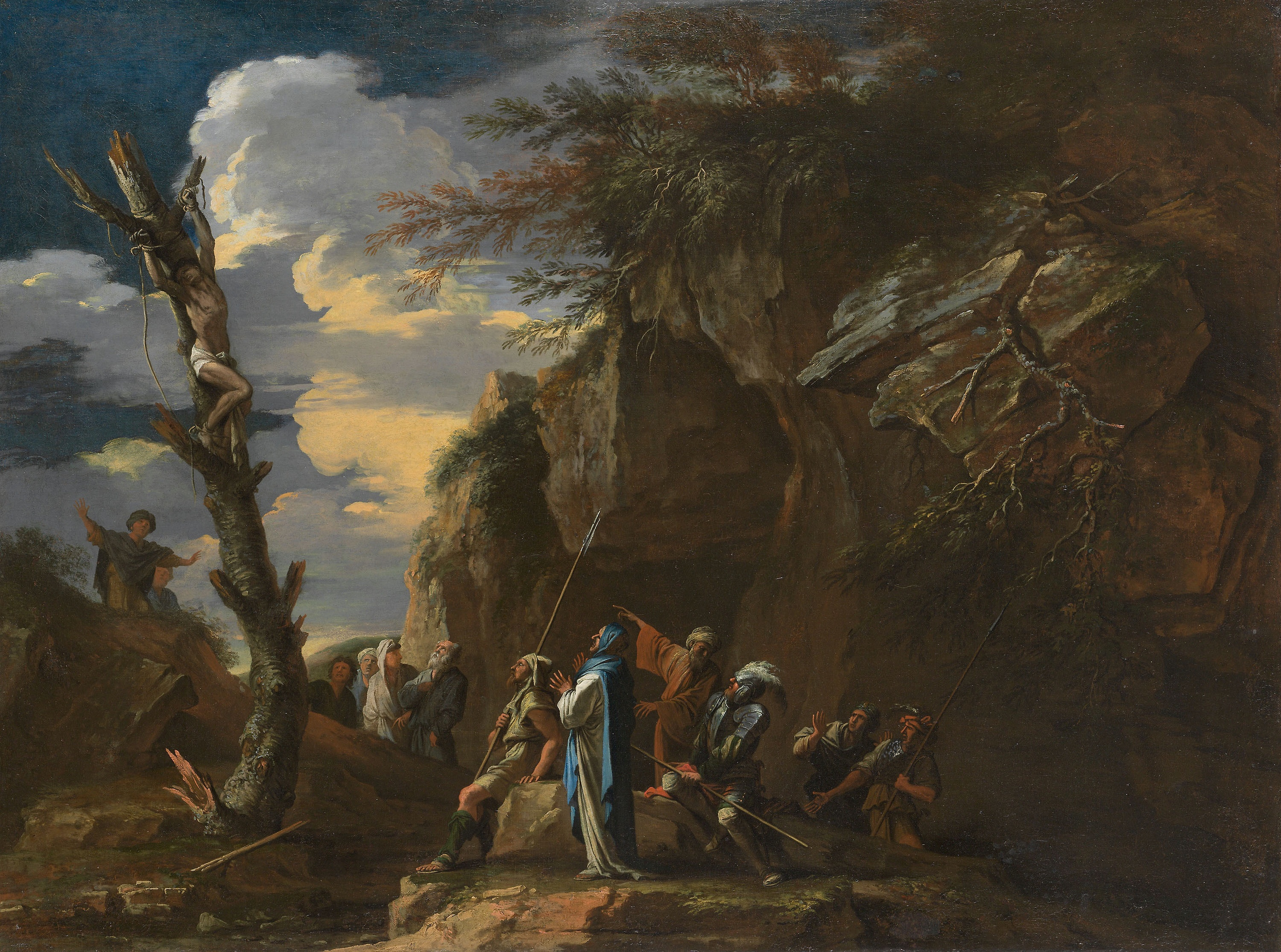
The crucifixion of Polycrates by Oroetes.

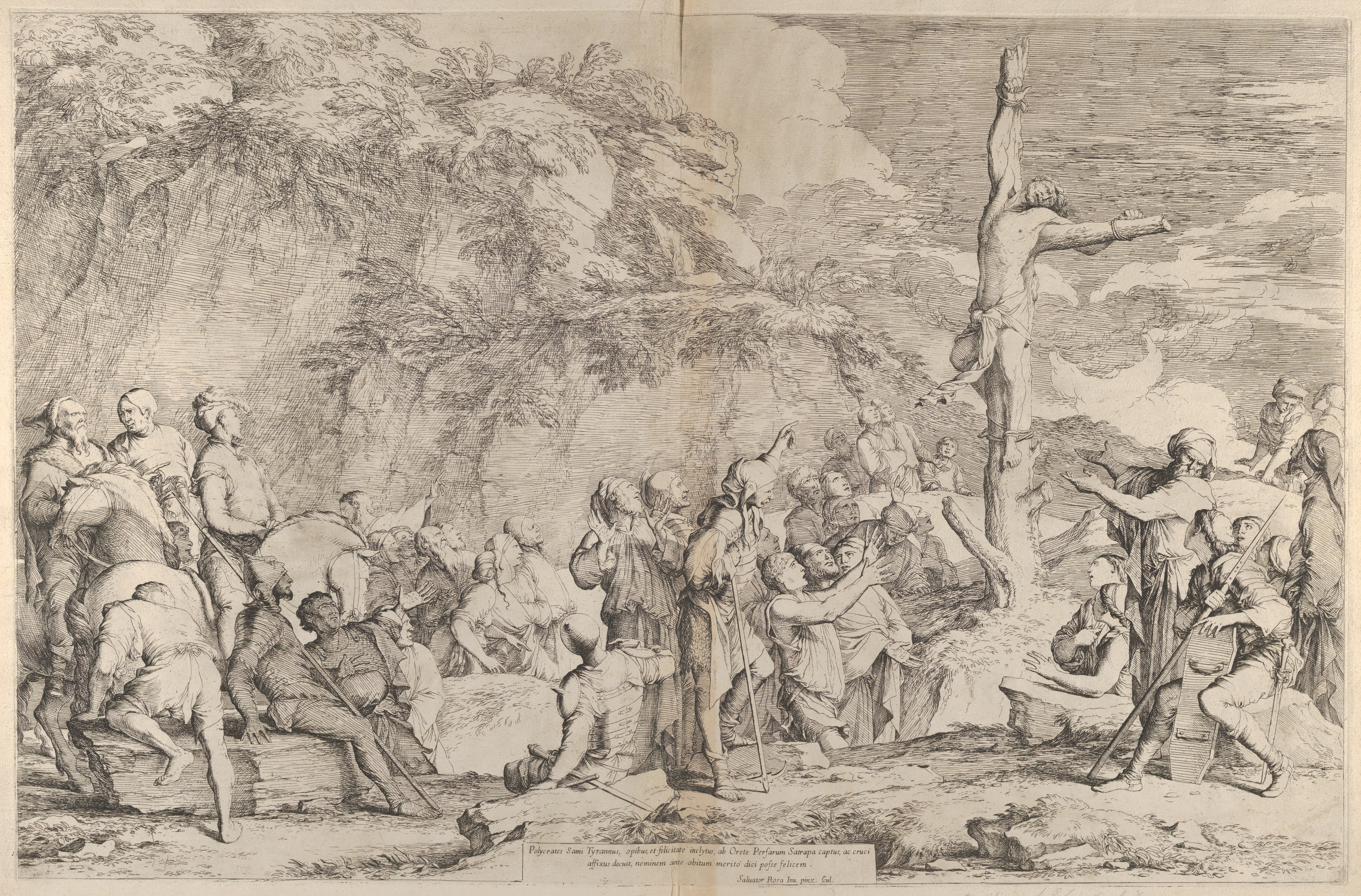
The crucifixion of Polycrates the tyrant after his capture by the Persians.

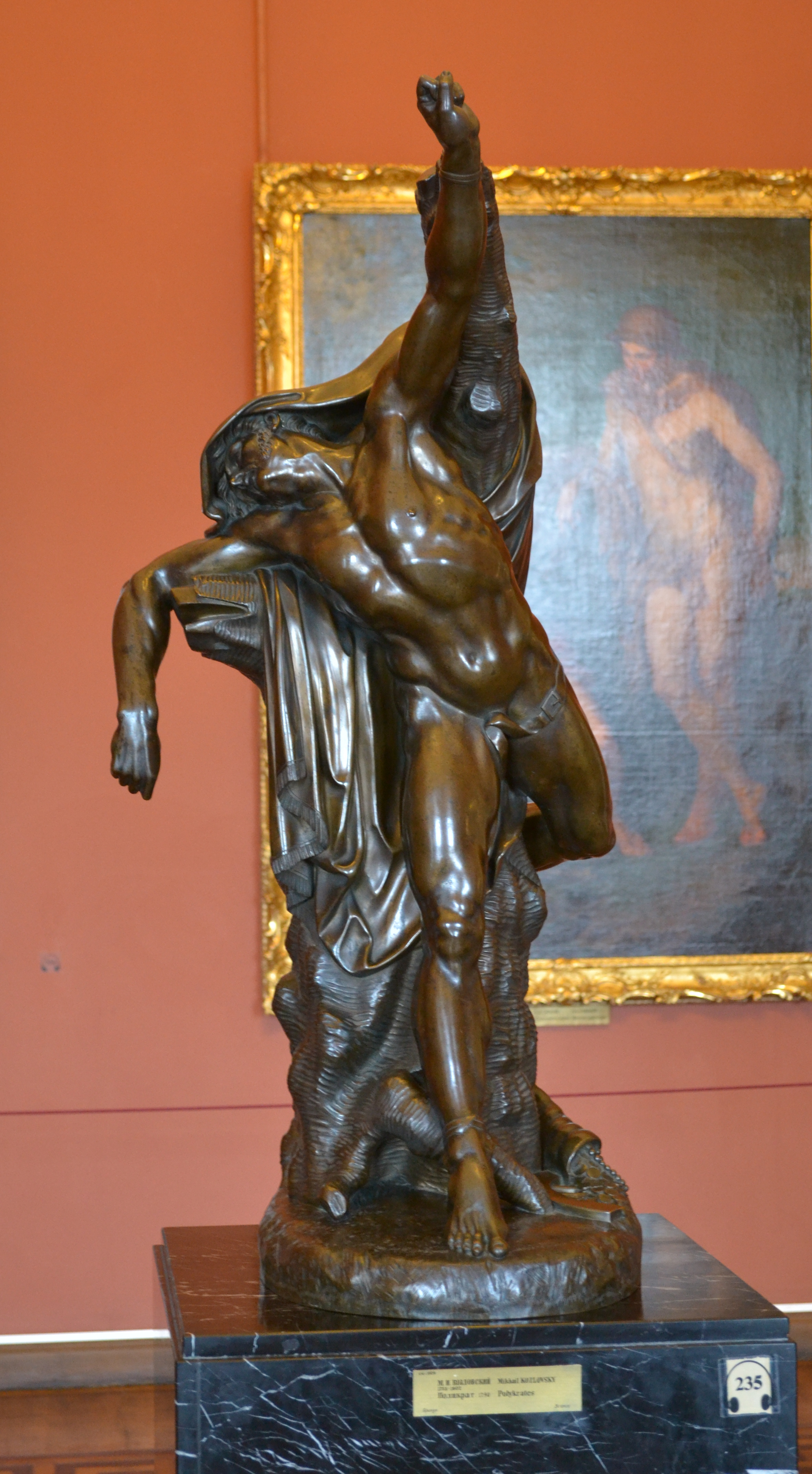
The crucifixion of Polycrates by Achaemenid Satrap Oroetes. Polykrates by M. Kozlovsky (1790, Russian museum).

== See also ==
- Piracy
- Metiochus and Parthenope

== Bibliography ==
- Carty, Aideen (2015). Polycrates, Tyrant of Samos: New Light on Archaic Greece. Stuttgart: Franz Steiner Verlag. ISBN 9783515108980.
- Shipley, Graham (1987). A History of Samos: 800-188 BC.
- Cadoux, T. J. (1956). "The Duration of the Samian Tyranny". Journal of Hellenic Studies. 76: 105–106. doi:10.2307/629559. JSTOR 629559. S2CID 163184237.
- White, M. (1954). "The Duration of the Samian Tyranny". Journal of Hellenic Studies. 74: 36–43. doi:10.2307/627553. JSTOR 627553. S2CID 161276674.
