= Syloson =

Late 6th century BC Persian vassal ruler of Samos

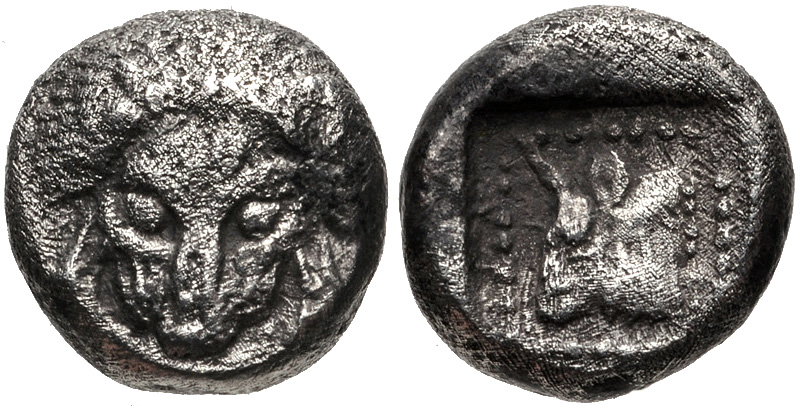
Coinage of Samos at the time of Syloson. Circa 500-494 BCE.

Syloson (Ancient Greek: Συλοσῶν, gen.: Συλοσῶνος) governed Samos as a vassal ruler on behalf of the Achaemenid Persian Empire. He was appointed by king Darius I and was the brother of Polycrates of Samos.

When Polycrates became tyrant of the island he exiled Syloson. Syloson went to Egypt, where he stayed until a "flame-coloured mantle" he was selling brought him in contact with Darius I of Persia. At the time Darius I of Persia was a spearman in Cambyses II of Persia's army. Syloson saw how much Darius liked the mantle and gave it to him for free.

When Darius rose to power Syloson went to visit him in Susa. Darius offered him gold and silver for his kindness in the past with the mantle but Syloson refused and wanted military assistance in retaking Samos. "To me, O king, give neither gold nor silver, but recover and give me my fatherland Samos, which now that my brother Polycrates has been slain by Oroites is possessed by our slave." Darius agreed and sent an expedition led by Otanes.

At the time when Syloson came back to the island of Samos, Maiandrios was holding rule but decided to give back power to the Samians and established a democracy. Maiandrios had fallen ill and his brothers Lycaretos and Charilaos were both trying to get possession of Samos.

The Samians had welcomed Syloson when he came, for the good legacy his brother had left. But Charilaos, after being released from prison, persuaded his brother to send mercenaries to attack the Persians. Maiandrios agreed because he loathed Syloson and escaped the island through a secret passage. With Charilaos commanding the mercenaries they were defeated in the uprising and the Persian commander Otanes, against Darius's orders, slew many Samians.

Syloson was succeeded by his son Aeaces.
