= Aeaces (son of Syloson) =

Late 6th/early 5th century BC ruler of Samos

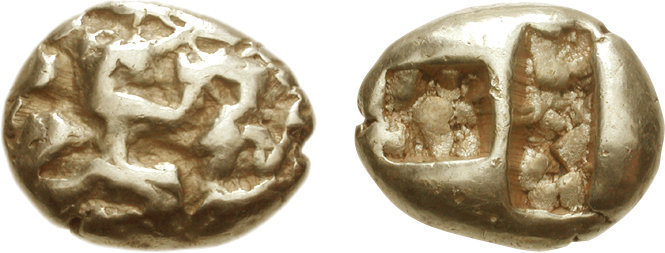
Electrum coinage of Samos. Circa 600-570 BCE.

Aeaces, son of Syloson (Ancient Greek: Αἰάκης Συλοσῶνος) was the ruler of Samos in the late sixth and early fifth centuries BC. He belonged to an established dynasty of Samian rulers - his father Syloson had been installed as ruler of Samos by the Persian king Darius I around 520 BC and his uncle Polycrates had reigned before that.

Aeaces was deprived of his tyranny by Aristagoras, when the Ionians revolted against Persian rule in 500 BC. He then fled to the Persians, and persuaded the Samians to abandon the other Ionians in the sea-fight between the Persians and Ionians. After this battle, in which the latter were defeated, he was restored to the tyranny of Samos by the Persians in 494 BC.
