= Battle of Lade =

Naval battle during the Ionian Revolt (494 BC)

- Part of the Ionian Revolt
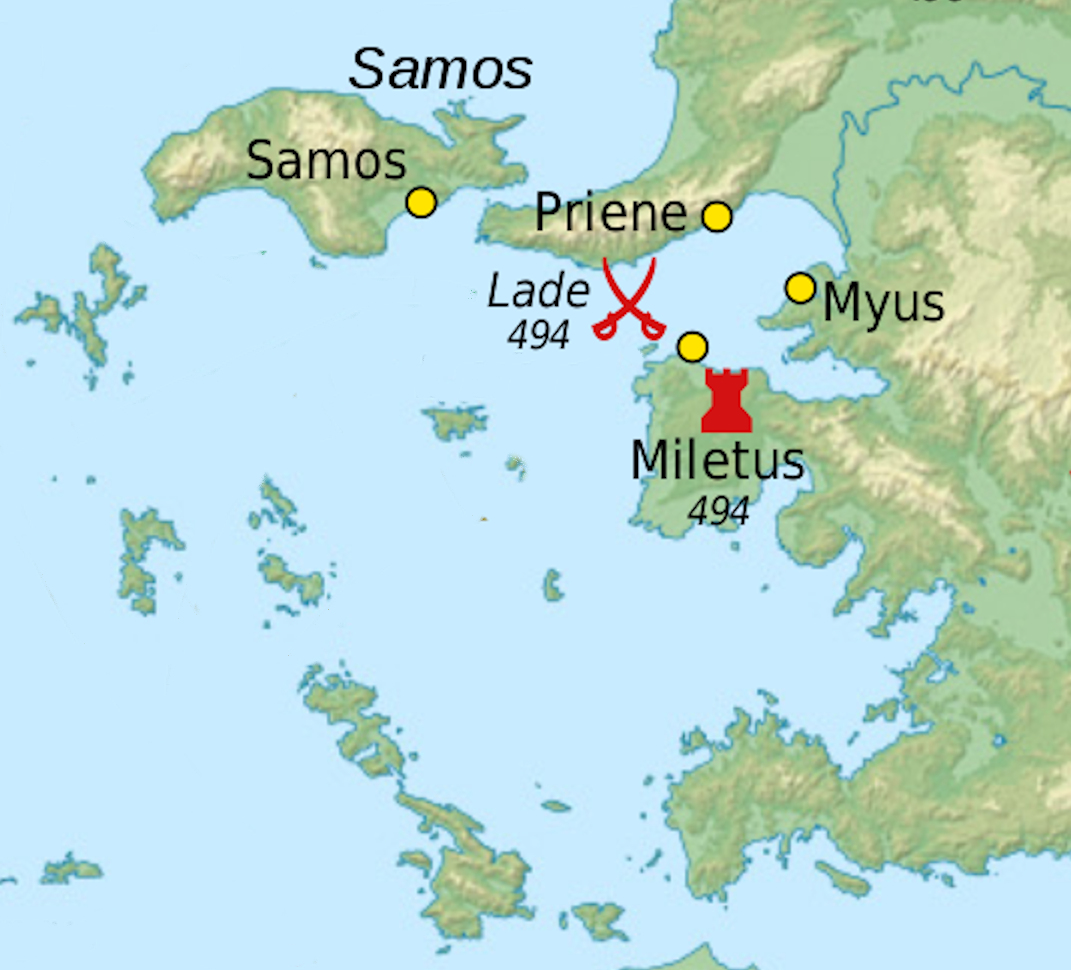
- Map of Lade, Miletus, and the Mycale peninsula.
Date	494 BC
Location	Near the island of Lade, off the coast of Miletus (modern-day Turkey) 37°33′N 27°06′E
Result	Persian decisive victory

Belligerents
Ionia	Achaemenid Empire

Commanders and leaders
Dionysios	Datis

Strength
353 ships (Herodotus)	600 ships (Herodotus)

Casualties and losses
246 ships	57 ships
- Location within Turkey Battle of Lade (Greece)

The Battle of Lade (Ancient Greek: Ναυμαχία τῆς Λάδης, romanized: Naumachia tēs Ladēs) was a naval battle which occurred during the Ionian Revolt, in 494 BC. It was fought between an alliance of the Ionian cities (joined by the Lesbians) and the Persian Empire of Darius the Great, and resulted in a decisive victory for the Persians which all but ended the revolt.

== History ==
The Ionian Revolt was triggered by the dissatisfaction of the Greek cities of Asia Minor with the tyrants appointed by Persia to rule them. In 499 BC, the then-tyrant of Miletus, Aristagoras, launched a joint expedition with the Persian satrap Artaphernes to conquer Naxos, in an attempt to bolster his position in Miletus. The mission was a debacle, and sensing his imminent removal as tyrant, Aristagoras chose to incite the whole of Ionia into rebellion against the Persian king Darius the Great. Initially, in 498 BC, the Ionians went on the offensive, supported by troops from Athens and Eretria, capturing Sardis, before suffering defeat at the Battle of Ephesus. The revolt then spread to Caria and Cyprus. Three years of Persian campaigning across Asia Minor followed, with no decisive effect. By 494 BC the Persian army and navy had regrouped, and made straight for the epicentre of the rebellion at Miletus.

The Ionians sought to defend Miletus by sea, leaving the defense of Miletus to the Milesians. The Ionian fleet gathered at the island of Lade, off the coast of Miletus. The Persians were uncertain of victory at Lade, so attempted to persuade some of the Ionian contingents to defect. Although this was unsuccessful at first, when the Persians finally attacked the Ionians, the Samian fleet accepted the Persian offer. As the Persian and Ionian fleets met, the Samians sailed away from the battle, causing the collapse of the Ionian battle line. Although the Chian contingent and a few other ships remained and fought bravely against the Persians, the battle was lost.

With the defeat at Lade, the Ionian Revolt was all but ended. The next year, the Persians reduced the last rebel strongholds, and began the process of bringing peace to the region. The Ionian Revolt constituted the second major conflict between ancient Greece and Persia, and as such represents the first phase of the Greco-Persian Wars. Although Asia Minor had been brought back into the Persian fold, Darius vowed to punish Athens and Eretria for their support of the revolt. Moreover, seeing that the myriad city states of Greece posed a continued threat to the stability of his empire, he decided to conquer the whole of Greece. In 492 BC, the first Persian invasion of Greece, the next phase of the Greco-Persian Wars, would begin as a direct consequence of the Ionian Revolt.

== Background ==
In the dark age that followed the collapse of the Mycenaean civilization, significant numbers of Greeks had emigrated to Asia Minor and settled there. These settlers were from three tribal groups: the Aeolians, Dorians and Ionians. The Ionians had settled about the coasts of Lydia and Caria, founding the twelve cities which made up Ionia. These cities were Miletus, Myus and Priene in Caria; Ephesus, Colophon, Lebedos, Teos, Clazomenae, Phocaea and Erythrae in Lydia; and the islands of Samos and Chios. The cities of Ionia had remained independent until they were conquered by the famous Lydian king Croesus, in around 560 BC. The Ionian cities then remained under Lydian rule until Lydia was in turn conquered by the nascent Achaemenid Empire of Cyrus the Great. The Persians found the Ionians difficult to rule. Elsewhere in the empire, Cyrus was able to identify elite native groups to help him rule his new subjects—such as the priesthood of Judea. No such group existed in Greek cities at this time; while there was usually an aristocracy, this was inevitably divided into feuding factions. The Persians thus settled for the sponsoring a tyrant in each Ionian city, even though this drew them into the Ionians' internal conflicts. Furthermore, a tyrant might develop an independent streak, and have to be replaced. The tyrants themselves faced a difficult task; they had to deflect the worst of their fellow citizens' hatred, while staying in the favour of the Persians.

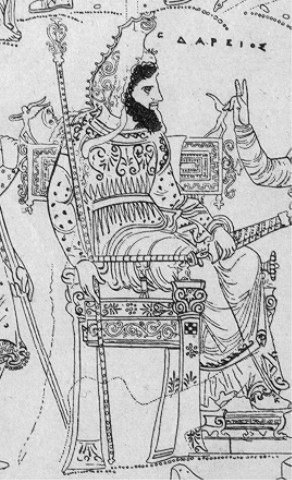
Darius I of Persia, as imagined by a Greek painter, 4th century BC

About 40 years after the Persian conquest of Ionia, and in the reign of the fourth Persian king, Darius the Great, the stand-in Milesian tyrant Aristagoras found himself in this familiar predicament. In 500 BC, Aristagoras was approached by some exiles from Naxos, who asked him to take control of the island. Seeing an opportunity to strengthen his position in Miletus by conquering Naxos, Aristagoras approached the satrap of Lydia, Artaphernes, proposing a joint attack on Naxos, to which Artaphernes assented.

The expedition sailed in the spring of 499 BC but quickly descended into a debacle The force laid siege to the Naxians for four months, but eventually the Persians and Aristagoras both ran out of money. The force therefore sailed despondently back to the mainland. Aristagoras found himself in dire straits and fully expected to be stripped of his position by Artaphernes. In a desperate attempt to save himself, Aristagoras chose to incite his own subjects, the Milesians, to revolt against their Persian masters, thereby beginning the Ionian Revolt. Although Herodotus presents the revolt as a consequence of Aristagoras's personal motives, it is clear that Ionia must have been ripe for rebellion anyway, the primary grievance being the tyrants installed by the Persians. Aristagoras's actions have thus been likened to tossing a flame into a kindling box; they incited rebellion across Ionia (and Aeolis and Doris), and tyrannies were everywhere abolished, and democracies established in their place.

Aristagoras had brought all of Hellenic Asia Minor into revolt, but evidently realised that the Greeks would need other allies in order to fight the Persians. In the winter of 499 BC, he sailed to mainland Greece to try to recruit allies. He failed to persuade the Spartans, but the cities of Athens and Eretria agreed to support the rebellion. In the spring of 498 BC, an Athenian force of twenty triremes, accompanied by five from Eretria, for a total of twenty-five triremes set sail for Ionia. They joined up with the main Ionian force near Ephesus. This force was then guided by the Ephesians through mountains to Sardis, Artaphernes's satrapal capital. The Greeks caught the Persians unawares, and were able to capture the lower city. However the lower city then caught fire, and the Greeks, demoralised, then retreated from the city, and began to make their way back to Ephesus. The Persians troops in Asia Minor followed the Greek force, catching them outside Ephesus. It is clear that the demoralised and tired Greeks were no match for the Persians, and were completely routed in the ensuing battle at Ephesus. The Ionians who escaped the battle made for their own cities, while the remaining Athenians and Eretrians managed to return to their ships, and sailed back to Greece.

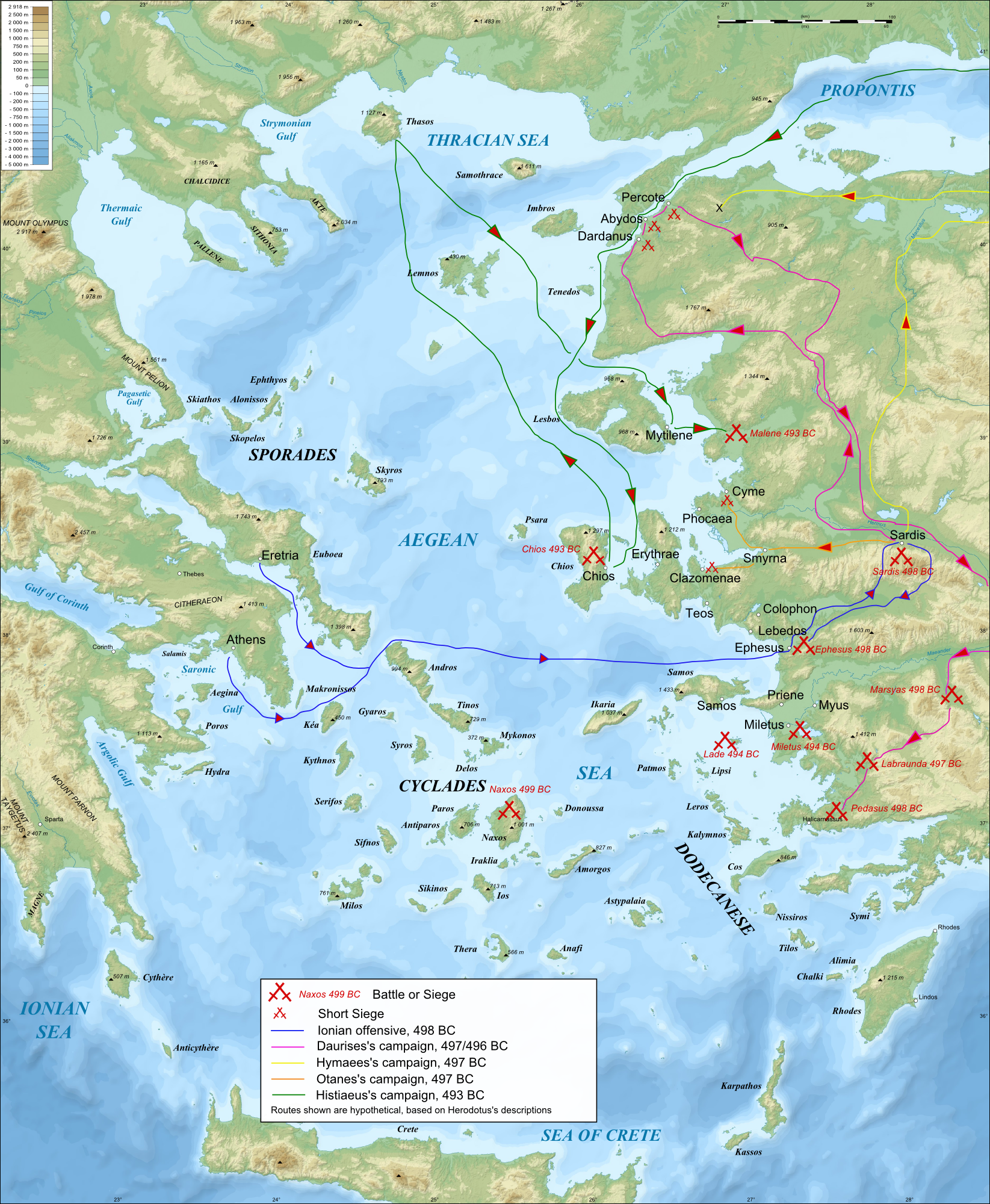
Main events of the Ionian Revolt

Despite these setbacks, the revolt spread further. The Ionians sent men to the Hellespont and Propontis, and captured Byzantium and the other nearby cities. They also persuaded the Carians to join the rebellion. Furthermore, seeing the spread of the rebellion, the kingdoms of Cyprus also revolted against Persian rule without any outside persuasion. For the next three years, the Persian army and navy were fully occupied with fighting the rebellions in Caria and Cyprus, and Ionia seems to have had an uneasy peace during these years. At the height of the Persian counter-offensive, Aristagoras, sensing the untenability of his position, decided to abandon his position as leader of Miletus, and of the revolt, and he left Miletus. Herodotus, who evidently has a rather negative view of him, suggests that Aristagoras simply lost his nerve and fled.

By the sixth year of the revolt (494 BC), the Persian forces had regrouped. The available land forces were gathered into one army, and were accompanied by a fleet supplied by the re-subjugated Cypriots, and the Egyptians, Cilicians and Phoenicians. The Persians headed directly to Miletus, paying little attention to other strongholds, presumably intending to tackle the revolt at its epicentre. The Median general Datis, an expert on Greek affairs, was certainly dispatched to Ionia by Darius at this time. It is therefore possible that he was in overall command of this Persian offensive. Hearing of the approach of this force, the Ionians met at the Panionium (the sacred meeting ground), and decided not to attempt to fight on land, leaving the Milesians to defend their walls. Instead, they opted to gather every ship they could, and make for the island of Lade, off the coast of Miletus, in order to "fight for Miletus at sea".

== Opposing forces ==
=== Greeks ===
City	Number of ships
Chios	100
Miletus	80
Lesbos	70
Samos	60
Teos	17
Priene	12
Erythrae	8
Myus	3
Phocaea	3
Total	353

The Ionian cities were joined in this battle by the Aeolians of Lesbos. Herodotus lists the number of ships provided by each state:

Herodotus gives the order of the Ionian battle line as being, from east to west; Miletus—Priene—Myus—Teos—Chios—Erythraea—Phocaea—Lesbos—Samos.

=== Persians ===
Herodotus says that there were 600 ships in the Persian fleet, provided by the Phoenicians (who were most eager to fight), the Egyptians, Cilicians, and the Cypriots, whose own revolt had recently been subdued. The Persian fleet may have been commanded by the veteran Median general Datis; Persian records seem to suggest that he was sent by Darius to Ionia at around about the time of Lade. However, Herodotus does not name any Persian commanders in this campaign.

== Prelude ==
When the Persians arrived off the coast of Lade and learned the number of Ionian ships, they began to worry that they would not be able to defeat the Greeks, and feared Darius's wrath should they fail. The Ionian tyrants who had been expelled at the beginning of the revolt were present, and according to Herodotus, they were now given instructions by the Persians:

Men of Ionia, let each one of you now show that he has done good service to the king's house; let each one of you try to separate your own countrymen from the rest of the allied power. Set this promise before them: they will suffer no harm for their rebellion, neither their temples nor their houses will be burnt, nor will they in any way be treated more violently than before. But if they will not do so and are set on fighting, then utter a threat that will restrain them: if they are defeated in battle, they will be enslaved; we will make eunuchs of their boys, and carry their maidens captive to Bactra, and hand over their land to others.

The tyrants thus sent messages to their own kinsman, but the Ionians refused the offers. Critically, each group thought that only they had been approached—there does not seem to have been any discussion of this offer between the different contingents, and the possibility for treachery does not seem to have been realised.

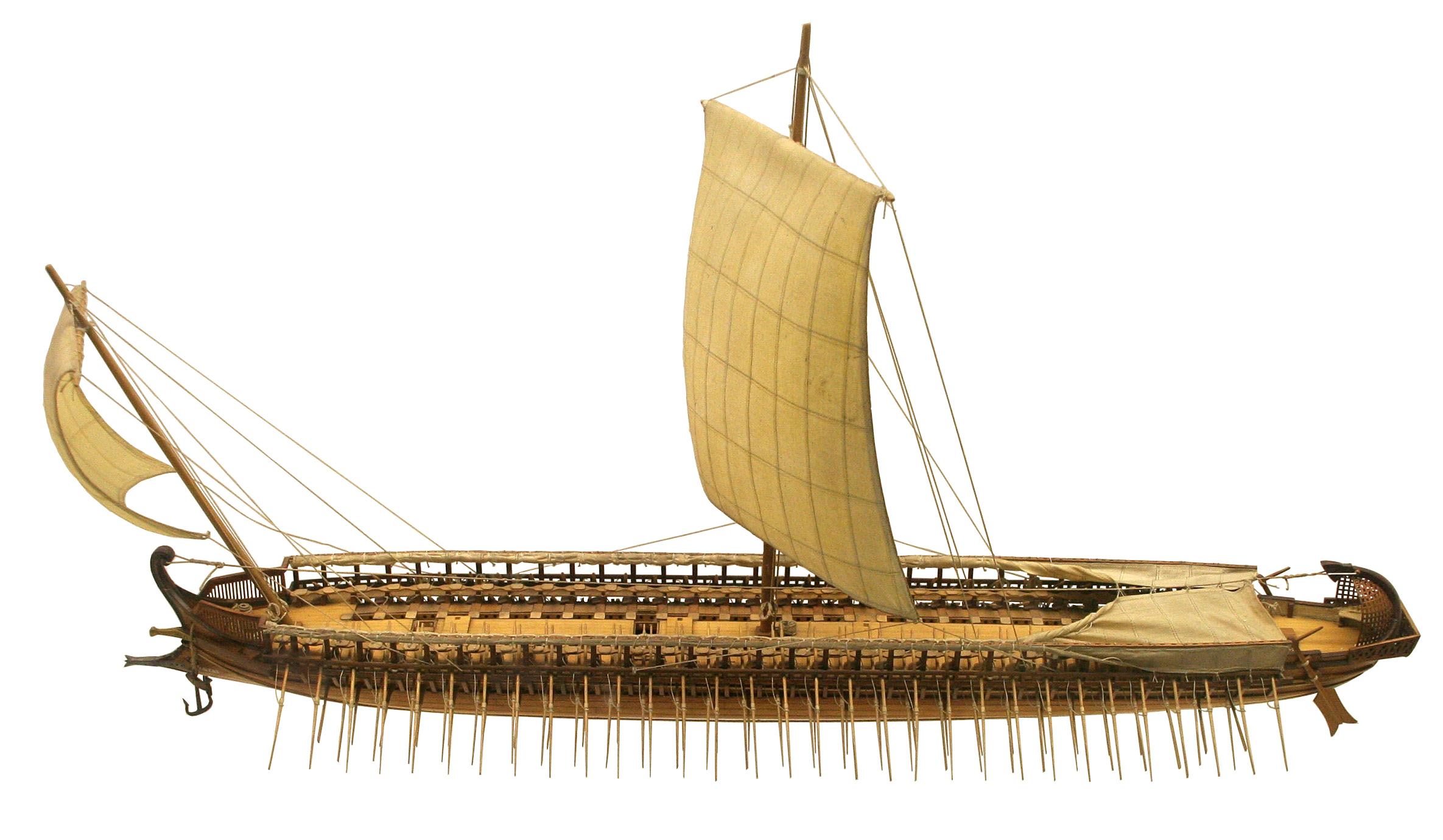
Reconstructed model of a trireme, the type of ship in use by both the Greek and Persian forces

The Ionians did however hold meetings to discuss the conduct of the battle. Dionysius, the Phocaean general, offered to train and lead the Greek force:

Our affairs, men of Ionia, stand on the edge of a razor, whether to be free men or slaves, and runaway slaves at that. If you now consent to endure hardships, you will have toil for the present time, but it will be in your power to overcome your enemies and gain freedom; but if you will be weak and disorderly, I see nothing that can save you from paying the penalty to the king for your rebellion. Believe me and entrust yourselves to me; I promise you that (if the gods deal fairly with us) either our enemies shall not meet us in battle, or if they do they shall be utterly vanquished.

Dionysius thus began an intensive training program, leading the fleet out every day to train the rowers in ramming manoeuvers, and the marines in combat. For seven days the Ionians accepted this regime, but being unused to the hard work, they refused to obey thereafter, and stayed in camp instead. According to Herodotus, upon seeing the resultant discontent and division in the Ionian camp, the Samians decided to accept the Persian offer of lenience in return for desertion. However, some modern historians reject the notion of dissent in the Greek camp. Herodotus derived his account of Lade from the Samians themselves, and it is suggested that, seeking to excuse their treachery, they came up with this story. At any rate, the Samians remained with the other Greeks in the run up to the battle.

== Battle ==
Soon after the rebellion against Dionysius, the Persian fleet moved to attack the Ionians, who sailed out to meet them. The ensuing battle was evidently confused, since Herodotus admits that "which of the Ionians were brave men or cowards then in that sea-fight I cannot exactly say; for they all blame each other". It is nevertheless clear that very early on in the battle, the Samian contingent hoisted their sails, as had been agreed, and fled the battlefield. However, 11 Samian ships refused to desert the other Ionians, and remained at the battle. At some later date, the Samians erected a pillar in their marketplace commemorating the bravery and sacrifice of these crews. Seeing the Samians leave, their neighbours on the western wing, the Lesbians, also fled. The whole west-wing of the Ionian battle line thus very quickly collapsed. Other Ionian contingents also fled as the situation became more desperate.

Only the large Chian navy seems to have stood their ground, perhaps accompanied by a few other ships. They fought valiantly, but had huge casualties. Eventually the remaining Chian ships sailed away back to Chios, thereby ending the battle.

== Aftermath ==
With the defeat of the Ionian fleet, the revolt was effectively over. Miletus was closely invested, the Persians "mining the walls and using every device against it, until they utterly captured it". According to Herodotus, most of the men were killed, and the women and children were enslaved. Archaeological evidence partially substantiates this, showing widespread signs of destruction, and abandonment of much of the city in the aftermath of Lade. However, some Milesians did remain in (or quickly returned to) Miletus, though the city would never recapture its former greatness. Miletus was thus notionally "left empty of Milesians"; the Persians took the city and coastal land for themselves, and gave the rest of the Milesian territory to Carians from Pedasus. The captive Milesians were brought before Darius in Susa, who settled them on the coast of the Persian Gulf, near the mouth of the Tigris.

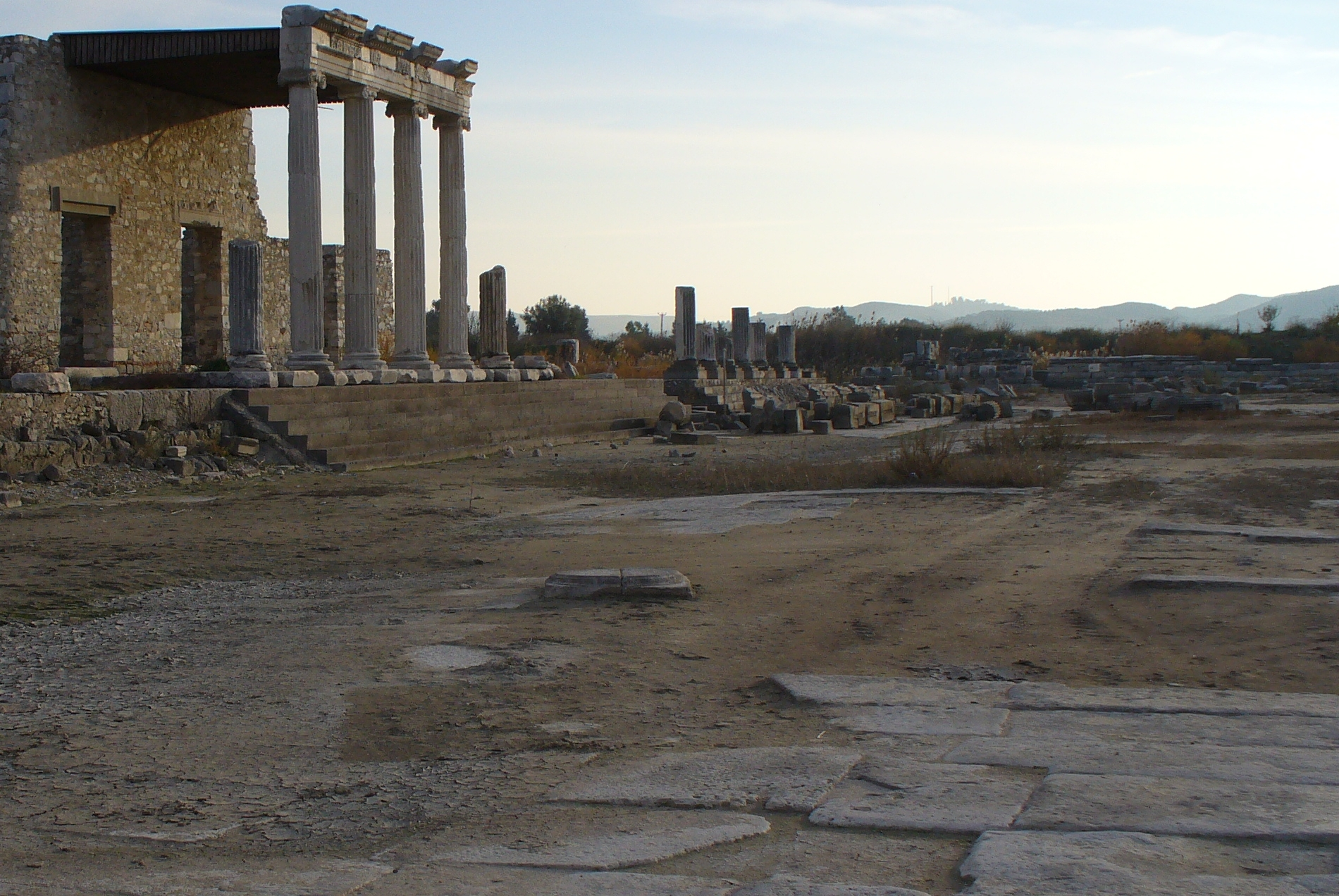
The ruins of Miletus

Many Samians were appalled by the actions of their generals at Lade, and resolved to emigrate before their old tyrant, Aeaces, returned to rule them. They accepted an invitation from the people of Zancle to settle on the coast of Sicily, and took with them such Milesians as had escaped from the Persians. Samos itself was spared from destruction by the Persians because of the Samian defection at Lade. Meanwhile, Dionysius of Phocaea went to Sicily, and established himself as a pirate, preying on Carthaginian ships.

Most of Caria surrendered to the Persians in aftermath of Lade, although some strongholds had to be captured through force. The Persian fleet and army wintered at Miletus, before setting out in 493 BC to finally stamp out the last embers of the revolt. They attacked and captured the islands of Chios, Lesbos and Tenedos and then moved over to the mainland, and captured each of the remaining cities of Ionia. Although the cities of Ionia were undoubtedly harrowed in the aftermath, none seems to have suffered quite the fate of Miletus. The Persian army then re-conquered the settlements on the Asian side of the Propontis, while the fleet sailed up the European coast of the Hellespont, taking each settlement in turn. With all of Asia Minor now firmly returned to Persian rule, the revolt was finally over.

For the Persians, the only unfinished business that remained by the end of 493 BC was to exact punishment on Athens and Eretria for supporting the revolt. The Ionian Revolt had severely threatened the stability of Darius's empire, and the states of mainland Greece would continue to threaten that stability unless dealt with. Darius thus began to contemplate the complete conquest of Greece, beginning with the destruction of Athens and Eretria. The first Persian invasion of Greece thus began in the following year, 492 BC, when Mardonius was dispatched (via Ionia) to complete the pacification of the land approaches to Greece, and push on to Athens and Eretria if possible. Thrace was re-subjugated, having broken loose from Persian rule during the revolts, and Macedon compelled to become a vassal of Persia. However, progress was halted by a naval disaster. A second expedition was launched in 490 BC under Datis and Artaphernes, son of the satrap Artaphernes. This amphibious force sailed across the Aegean, subjugating the Cyclades, before arriving off Euboea. Eretria was besieged, captured and destroyed, and the force then moved onto Attica. Landing at the Bay of Marathon, they were met by an Athenian army, and defeated in the famous Battle of Marathon, ending the first Persian attempt to subdue Greece.

== Bibliography ==
=== Ancient sources ===
- Herodotus, The Histories

=== Modern Sources ===
- Boardman J; Bury JB; Cook SA; Adcock FA; Hammond NGL; Charlesworth MP; Lewis DM; Baynes NH; Ostwald M; Seltman CT (1988). The Cambridge Ancient History, vol. 5. Cambridge University Press. ISBN 0-521-22804-2.
- Fehling, D. (1989). Herodotus and His "Sources": Citation, Invention, and Narrative Art (Translated by J.G. Howie). Francis Cairns.
- Fine, JVA (1983). The Ancient Greeks: A Critical History. Harvard University Press. ISBN 0-674-03314-0.
- Finley, Moses (1972). "Introduction". Thucydides – History of the Peloponnesian War (translated by Rex Warner). Penguin. ISBN 0-14-044039-9.
- Holland, Tom (2006). Persian Fire: The First World Empire and the Battle for the West. Doubleday. ISBN 0-385-51311-9.
