= Stouronisi =

Small island in the Euboean Sea

Native name: Στουρονήσι
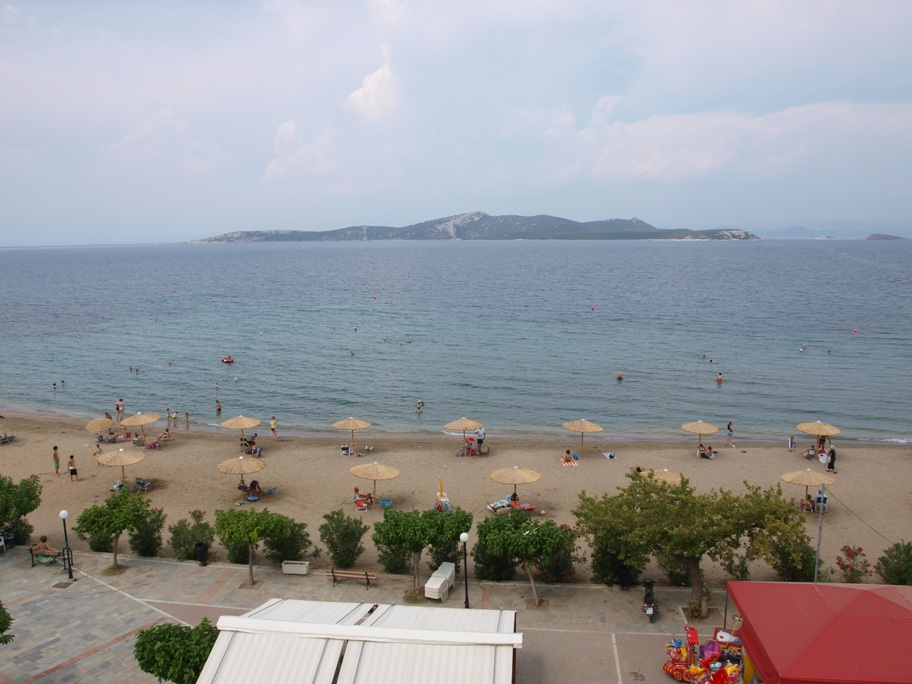
- Stouronisi opposite Styra

- Location within Greece

Geography
- Coordinates: 38.170722°N 24.160917°E
- Area: 2 km^{2} (0.77 sq mi)

Administration
- Greece
- Region: Central Greece
- Regional unit: Euboea

Demographics
- Population: 0 (2011)

Stouronisi (Greek: Στουρονήσι) or Styronisi (Στυρονήσι, "island of Styra") is a small island in the South Euboean Gulf opposite Styra. It is the largest island of a small island complex comprising 7 islets and rocks. The island has an area about 2 km^{2}. Stouronisi has recently become known because of some plans of the Greek government for a development of a high-class summer resort in the island.

== History ==
In antiquity, the island was named Aegilia or Aigilia (Ancient Greek: Αἰγιλία), or Aigileia or Aegileia (Αἰγίλεια), and was referred by Herodotus. Herodotus writes that during the First Persian invasion of Greece (492-490 BCE), the captives from the Siege of Eretria were kept on Aegilia (which belonged to Styra) during the Battle of Marathon (490 BCE). After the battle, these captives were picked up, and eventually sent to Darius I in Susa, Persia.

The Euboean Sea is an important passage for the ships, so around the coasts of Stouronisi, some ancient wrecks have been found. The submarine exploration of one wreck has been shot as part of an award winning documentary. The most notable ancient wreck belongs to Hellenistic era. During Greek War of Independence the island was used as shelter of Greek guerillas. Odysseas Androutsos and Nikolaos Krieziotis turned to the island those years. Today the island is uninhabited but the Greek government has plans for the conversion of the island into a high-class summer resort.
