= Styra =

Town in ancient Euboea, Greece

Coordinates: 38°08′44″N 24°15′39″E

Styra (Ancient Greek: τὰ Στύρα) was a town of ancient Euboea, on the west coast, north of Carystus, and nearly opposite the promontory of Cynosura in Attica. The town stood near the shore in the inner part of the bay, in the middle of which is the island Aegileia, now called Stouronisi. Styra is mentioned by Homer along with Carystus in the Catalogue of Ships in the Iliad. Its inhabitants were originally Dryopians, though they denied this origin, and claimed to be descended from the deme of Steiria in Attica. In the First Persian War (490 BCE) the Persians landed at Aegileia, which belonged to Styra, the prisoners whom they had taken at Eretria. In the Second Persian War (480-479 BCE) the Styrians fought at the battles of Artemisium, Salamis, and Plataeae. They sent two ships to the naval engagements, and at Plataeae they and the Eretrians amounted together to 600 men. They afterwards became the subjects of Athens, and paid a yearly tribute of 1200 drachmae. The Athenian fleet was stationed here in 356 BCE. Strabo relates that the town was destroyed in the "Maliac War" by the Athenian Phaedrus, and its territory given to the Eretrians; but as the Maliac War is not mentioned elsewhere, we ought probably to substitute Lamian War for it.

Its site is located within the borders of the modern Styra, Greece.
