= Styra, Greece =

Styra Στύρα
- Municipal unit
- Location within the regional unit

- Location within Greece
- Coordinates: 38°10′N 24°15′E
- Country: Greece
- Administrative region: Central Greece
- Regional unit: Euboea
- Municipality: Karystos

Area
  - Municipal unit: 188.583 km^{2} (72.812 sq mi)
- Elevation: 10 m (33 ft)

Population (2021)
  - Municipal unit: 2,686
  - Municipal unit density: 14.24/km^{2} (36.89/sq mi)
  - Community: 528
- Time zone: UTC+2 (EET)
  - Summer (DST): UTC+3 (EEST)
- Postal code: 340 15
- Area code: 22240
- Vehicle registration: ΧΑ

Styra (Greek: Στύρα, also Χωριό - Chorio) is a village and a former municipality on the island Euboea, Greece. Since the 2011 local government reform it is part of the municipality Karystos, of which it is a municipal unit. The municipal unit has an area of 188.583 km^{2}. It is located in the southern part of Euboea, facing the eastern shore of Attica across the South Euboean Gulf. Nowadays it can be reached by ferryboat from the tiny harbor of Agia Marina, as well as by bridge from Chalcis. the Stouronisi (Styra Island).takes its name from the town of Styra.

== Population ==
Year	Community population	Municipal unit population
1991	394	3,161
2001	741	2,840
2011	660	2,716
2021	528	2,686

Actually there are two towns, Nea Styra or ( Beach "Paralia") (New) and Styra or "Chorio" (Old). The Nea Styra or "Paralia" is a more modern tourist area with beautiful views, beaches, hotels, cafes, bookstores, nightclubs, shops, and bars. There are two doctors in Styra that share time between Nea Styra and Styra or "Chorio". In between Nea Styra and Styra is the ancient city of Styra, a city mentioned by Homer's Iliad (Rhapsody B). Ships left from the ancient city state of Styra to aid in the rescue of Helen of Troy.

== History ==
Near Styra there are ancient structures standing which are 4,500 years old and are constructed using Megalithic Architecture. They are called Drakospita (i.e. dragon houses) and have been built using huge one piece stones (monoliths). The size of each of these stones is 4.0m length x 2.5m width x 1.5m height, similar to those found in the Philippines and at Stonehenge. Styra is a Arvanitika speaking community.
