= Cissia (area) =

Region of the Achaemenid Empire mentioned in ancient Greek literature

- κισσϊα (Kyssia) (Ancient Greek)
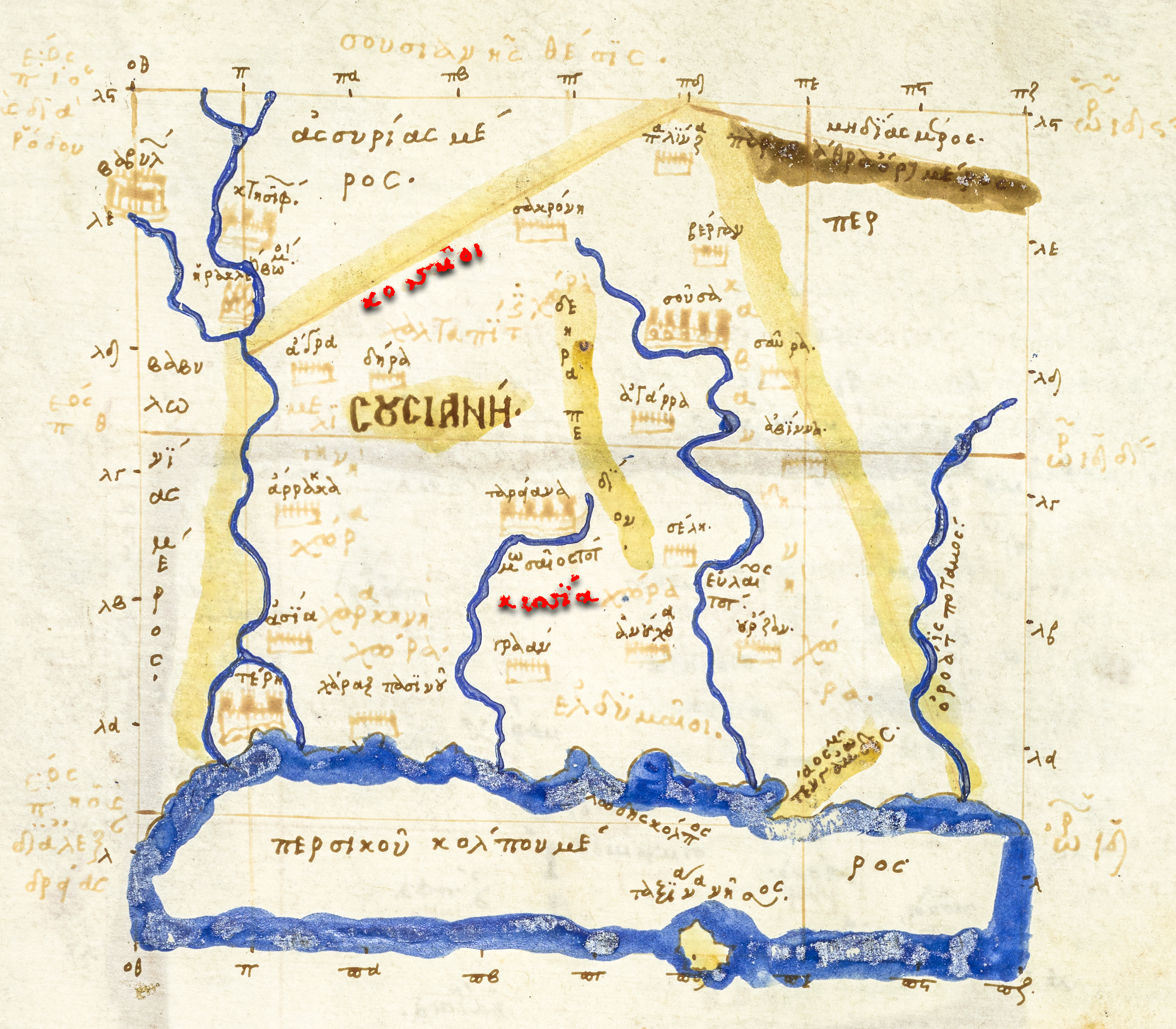
- The southwestern portions of Ptolemy's Geography depicting Susiana with κοσσαῑοι (Cossaei; north) and κισσϊα (Kyssia; south) highlighted.
- Location: Iran
- Region: Susiana

Cissia (Ancient Greek: Κισσία, Kissia) was a very fertile district of Susiana in the Persian Empire, on the Choaspes. According to Herodotus, the inhabitants, Cissii, were a 'wild', free people, resembling the Persians in their manners.

Herodotus and other ancient Greek writers sometimes referred to the region around Susa as "Cissia", a variant of the Kassite name. However, it is not clear if Kassites were actually living in that region so late.

== History ==
In ancient times Cissia was subjugated by Tiglath-Pileser III.

Once the Ionian Revolt was finally crushed by the Persian victory at the Battle of Lade, Darius began to plan to subjugate Greece. In 490 BC, he sent a naval task force under Datis and Artaphernes across the Aegean to subjugate the Cyclades, and then to make punitive attacks on Athens and Eretria. Reaching Euboea in mid-summer after a successful campaign in the Aegean, the Persians proceeded to put Eretria under siege. The siege lasted six days before a fifth column of Eretrian nobles betrayed the city to the Persians. The city was plundered, and the population enslaved on Darius's orders. The Eretrian prisoners were eventually taken to Persia and settled as colonists in Cissia, in the village of Ardericca.

Darius the Great, contrary to Eretrian expectations, treated them kindly, and gave them a village in the country of Cissia for their habitation, which was but a day's journey from Susa, where Apollonius of Tyana found some of their descendants 600 years afterwards.

Herodotus divided the Achaemenid Empire into 20 districts. According to him, Susa and the surrounding area, Cissia, paid 300 talents tribute.

== Sources ==
- Harry Thurston Peck. Harpers Dictionary of Classical Antiquities. New York. Harper and Brothers. 1898.
