= Dionysius the Phocaean =

5th century BC Phocaean Greek admiral

Dionysius the Phocaean or Dionysius of Phocaea (Greek: Διονύσιος) (fl. 494 BC) was a Phocaean admiral of ancient Greece during the Persian Wars of 5th century BC, and was the commander of the Ionian fleet at the Battle of Lade in 494 BC. Although commanding a formidable force, according to the Greek historian Herodotus, his men were worked so hard in preparing for battle that on the eve of the battle they refused to engage the Persian fleet.

Although little is known of his life, Dionysius was in command of the Ionian contingent, gathered from the many islands throughout Ionia, which joined the main Greek naval force outside Miletus' port of Lade. Upon his arrival in the naval camp of Lade, he observed that his men displayed low morale and suffered from a lack of discipline. Believing his men were unprepared for the impending battle, he called a general assembly among the camp and, in a speech to his men, said: "Now for our affairs are on the razor's edge, men of Ionia, wither we are to be free or slaves [...] so if you will bear hardships now, you will suffer temporarily but be able to overcome your enemies."

He then began ordering his men to perform several hours of martial exercises a day as well as drawing out the fleet in the order of battle and instructed the rowers and marines in naval tactics. After a week, dissension began to appear within the ranks of the Samians and other officers (particularly as Dionysius, who arrived with only three ships, exerted such a strong influence over the rest of the fleet).

Even as the battle began, many of the Ionian ships under the command of Dionysius still refused to engage with the Persians and eventually almost 120 of the 350 Greek warships abandoned the battle leaving the remaining Greek ships to be annihilated leaving the city of Miletus to the mercy of the Persians. Despite this setback, Dionysius continued fighting the Persians sinking three warships before being forced to retreat during the final hours of the battle.

Returning to Phocaea, Dionysius attacked several trading vessels and seized their cargo before arriving in Sicily. During his later years, he would become involved in piracy against the Carthaginian and Tyrsenian merchants. However, in keeping with the friendship between Phocaea and Greece, he left travelling Greek merchants alone.
