= Ardericca in Susiana =

Ardericca in Susiana (also spelled Arderikka; Ancient Greek: Ἀρδέρικκα) was an ancient village in Cissia mentioned by Herodotus (6.119.2). Described as being located about 40 km from Susa, it is noted for being the location where the Achaemenid king Darius I (r. 522-486 BC) settled the inhabitants of Eretria, after the city was taken by his admiral Datis in 490 BC. The site is commonly identified with the modern-day place of "Kīr-āb", located to the north of Susa. Herodotus further states that the village was famous for a spring located 7 km from it, where salt, oil and asphalt were produced. He also described it as being a stathmos ("farmstead") of Darius I, implying that Ardericca in Susiana was perhaps one of the king's own estates.

Herodotus also mention that the Eretrians were still living there during his time and they were speaking Greek.

== Sources ==
- Schmitt, R. (1986). "ARDERIKKA". In Yarshater, Ehsan (ed.). Encyclopædia Iranica. Vol. II/4: Architecture IV–Armenia and Iran IV. London and New York: Routledge & Kegan Paul. p. 385. ISBN 978-0-71009-104-8.
- Schmitt, R. (1991). "CISSIANS". In Yarshater, Ehsan (ed.). Encyclopædia Iranica. Vol. V/6: C̆ihrdād Nask–Class system V. London and New York: Routledge & Kegan Paul. p. 601. ISBN 978-0-939214-73-0.
