= Cossaei =

Ancient Greek name for the Kassites

Cossaei Κοσσαῑοι (Kossaioi)
- Hill people
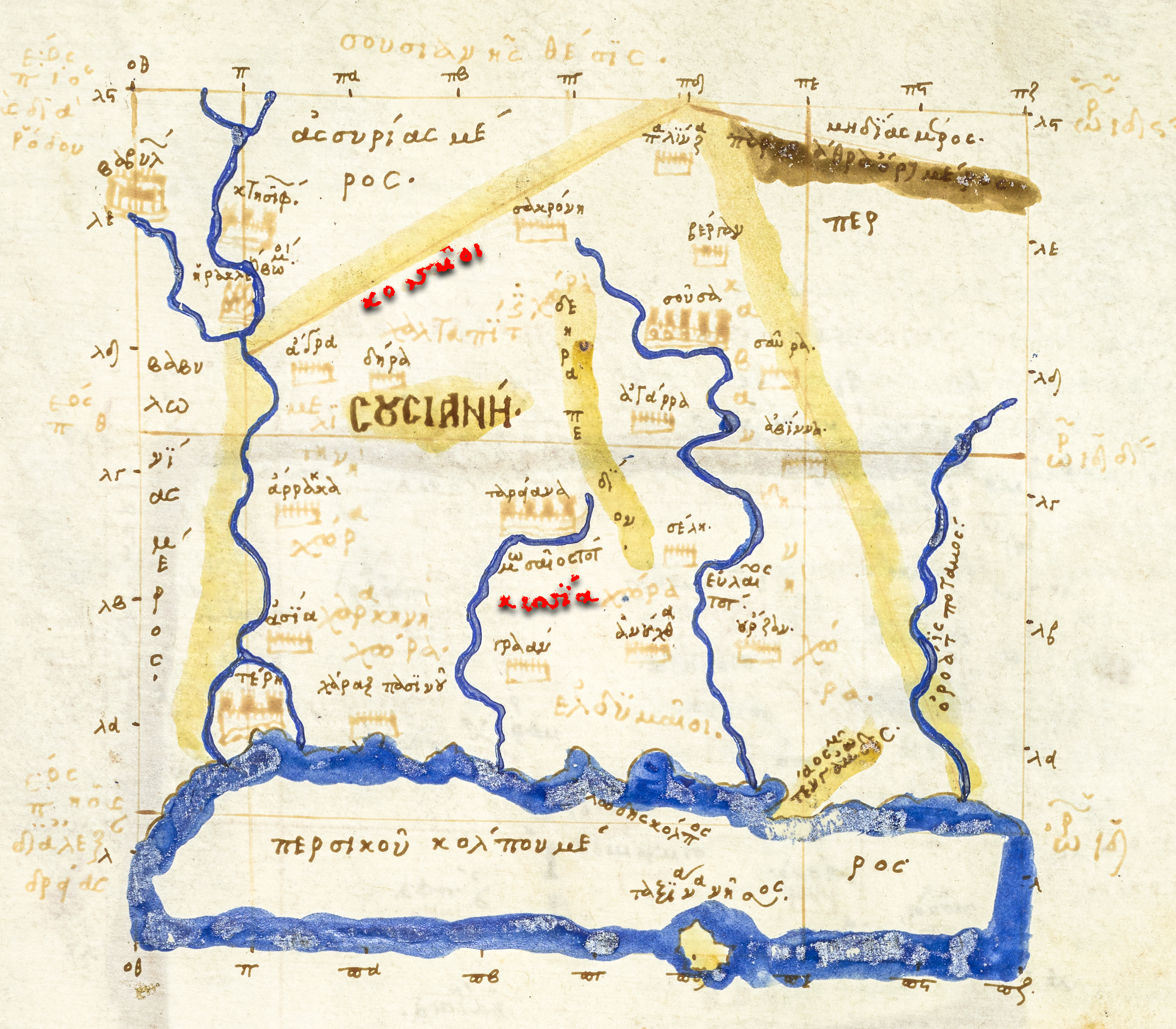
- The southwestern portions of Ptolemy's Geography depicting Susiana with κοσσαῑοι (Kossaioi; north) and κισσϊα (Kyssia; south) highlighted.
- Location: Susiana
- Descended from: Kassites
- Demonym: Κοσσαῖος (Cossaean)

Cossaei (Ancient Greek: Κοσσαῖοι, romanized: Kossaioi) were a warlike tribe inhabiting a mountainous district called Cossaea (Κοσσαία), likely descended from the Kassites, on the borders of Susiana to the south, and of Media Magna to the north; the modern Zagros Mountains. They were a hill tribe, and were armed with bows and arrows. Their land was sterile and unproductive, and they lived the life of robbers. Strabo speaks of them as constantly at war with their neighbours, and testifies to their power when he says that they sent 13,000 men to assist the Elymaei in a war against the people of Babylonia and Susiana. Alexander led his forces against them and subdued them, at least for a time. The Persian kings had never been able to reduce them, but had been in the habit of paying them a tribute, when they moved their court annually from Ecbatana to Babylon, to pass their winter at the latter place. In character, they seem to have resembled the Bakhtiari tribes, who now roam over the same mountains which they formerly occupied.

There is some variety in the orthography of their name in ancient authors. Pliny calls them Cussii, and in some places they are apparently confounded with the Cissii. It is possible that their name may be connected with the modern Khuzistan.

The history of the Kassites/Cossaei after 600 BC is reconstructed principally from sources written in Greek or Latin; they had a reputation for brigandage, preying on travellers passing through the mountains and exacting tribute for passage even from Persian rulers. They did not submit to the Achaemenids, but may have sent soldiers to fight with the forces of Darius III against Alexander the Great near Arbela in 331 BC. They were the object of the last winter campaign of Alexander in 324/323 BC, and some of them were included in a military contingent of Persians and Tapurians brought to Babylon by Peucestas. Later Antigonus refused to pay the Cossaei for safe passage through the mountains, and his army suffered heavy casualties on a march to Ecbatana. According to classical accounts, the Cossaei were expert bowmen, lived in caves, and ate a strange diet (acorns, mushrooms, and smoked flesh of wild animals); their mountainous land was small and barren, though it had a relatively good supply of timber.

== See also ==
- Kassite Dynasty
