= Mardonius (nephew of Darius I) =

Persian military commander (died 479 BC)

Mardonius (Old Persian: 𐎶𐎼𐎯𐎢𐎴𐎡𐎹 Mr̥duniyaʰ; Ancient Greek: Μαρδόνιος Mardónios; died 27/28 August 479 BC) was a Persian military commander during the Greco-Persian Wars. Though he secured initial victories in the first Persian invasion of Greece, he was ultimately forced to retreat into Anatolia after suffering catastrophic losses in both men and material due to a storm off the coast of Mount Athos, following which he was relieved of his command by Darius the Great. He was later re-appointed by Xerxes I and took part in the second Persian invasion of Greece. In 480 and 479 BC, Mardonius spearheaded the Persian army's destruction of Athens. Shortly thereafter, he was killed during the Battle of Plataea.

== Early and personal life ==
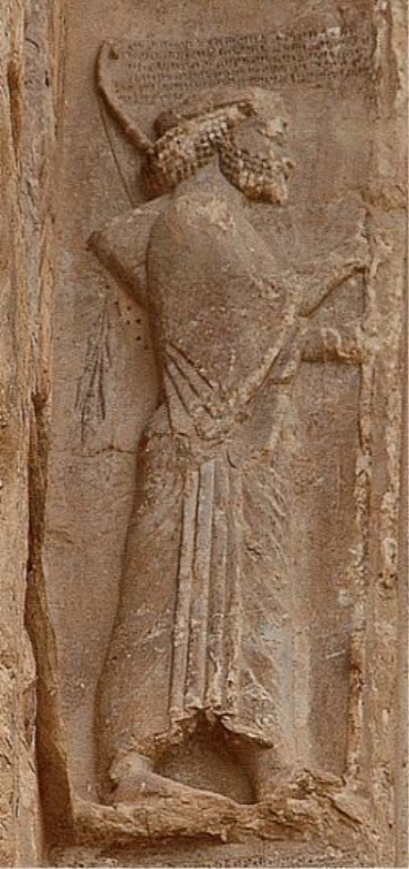
Gobryas, father of Mardonius, on the tomb of Darius I.

Mardonius was the son of Gobryas, a Persian nobleman who had assisted the Achaemenid prince Darius when he claimed the throne. The alliance between the new king and his friend was cemented by diplomatic marriages: Darius married Gobryas' daughter, and Gobryas married Darius' sister. Furthermore, Mardonius married Darius' daughter Artozostra. Thus, Darius the Great was simultaneously Mardonius' uncle, father-in-law, and half-brother-in-law.

== Military career ==
=== First Persian invasion of Greece ===
Darius appointed Mardonius as one of his generals and, after the Ionian Revolt, sent him in 492 BC to retaliate against the Greek city-state of Athens for assisting the Ionians. On his way to Athens, he used his army in the Ionian cities to depose the Greek tyrants and set up democratic governments, an action which surprised the Greeks at that time. Historians consider that he may have taken this action so that the Ionians would not revolt a second time after the Persian army had passed through. His fleet and army then passed across the Hellespont.

Mardonius first attacked Thasos, a Greek island which possessed gold mines. It became a tributary of the Achaemenid empire. The navy and the army continued onto Macedonia, which was soon added to the Persian Empire as a fully subordinate client kingdom, becoming also part of its administrative system.

However, after these victories, Mardonius’ fleet was destroyed in a storm off the coast near Mount Athos. According to Herodotus, the Persians lost 300 ships and 20,000 men. Around this time, Mardonius was commanding the army in a battle in Thrace. While Mardonius was wounded in the battle, he was victorious, re-subjugating Thrace into the empire. Nevertheless, the loss of the fleet meant that he had to retreat back into Asia Minor. He was relieved of his command by Darius, who appointed Datis and Artaphernes junior to lead the invasion of Greece in 490 BC, and though they were subsequently successful in capturing Naxos and destroying Eretria, they were later defeated at the Battle of Marathon.

=== Second Persian invasion of Greece ===
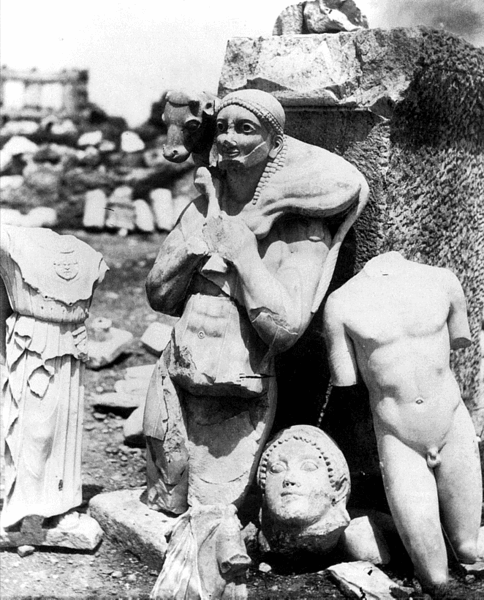
Mardonius led the Destruction of Athens. Part of the archaeological remains called Perserschutt, or "Persian rubble".

Mardonius came back into favour under Darius' successor Xerxes I, Mardonius' cousin and brother-in-law. Xerxes was at first not interested in renewing the war with Greece, but Mardonius, who had the most influence on Xerxes in all of Persia, repeatedly tried to convince him that he must avenge Darius's defeat, even going so far as to accuse Xerxes of cowardice. This view was opposed by another of Xerxes’ advisors, Artabanus, who urged more caution in the matter. Herodotus, who portrays Mardonius as a somewhat evil adviser (as opposed to a number of other good advisers whose arguments are never followed), says that Mardonius simply wanted to become satrap (governor) of Greece and had a love for 'mischief and adventure'.

He was present at the Battle of Thermopylae, and after the Persian defeat at the Battle of Salamis, he attempted to convince Xerxes to stay and fight yet another campaign. This time Mardonius could not persuade Xerxes, but when Xerxes left he did become governor of those parts of Greece that had been conquered by the Persians. He subdued Macedon, ruled at that time by King Alexander I, but Alexander himself gave valuable information about Mardonius' plans to the Athenians, saying that, as a Greek, he could not bear to see Greece defeated.

After the first part of the campaign directly under the orders Xerxes I, Mardonius remained in Greece with 300,000 elite troops, who fought in the last stages of the war, destroying Athens, but being finally vanquished at the Battle of Platea:

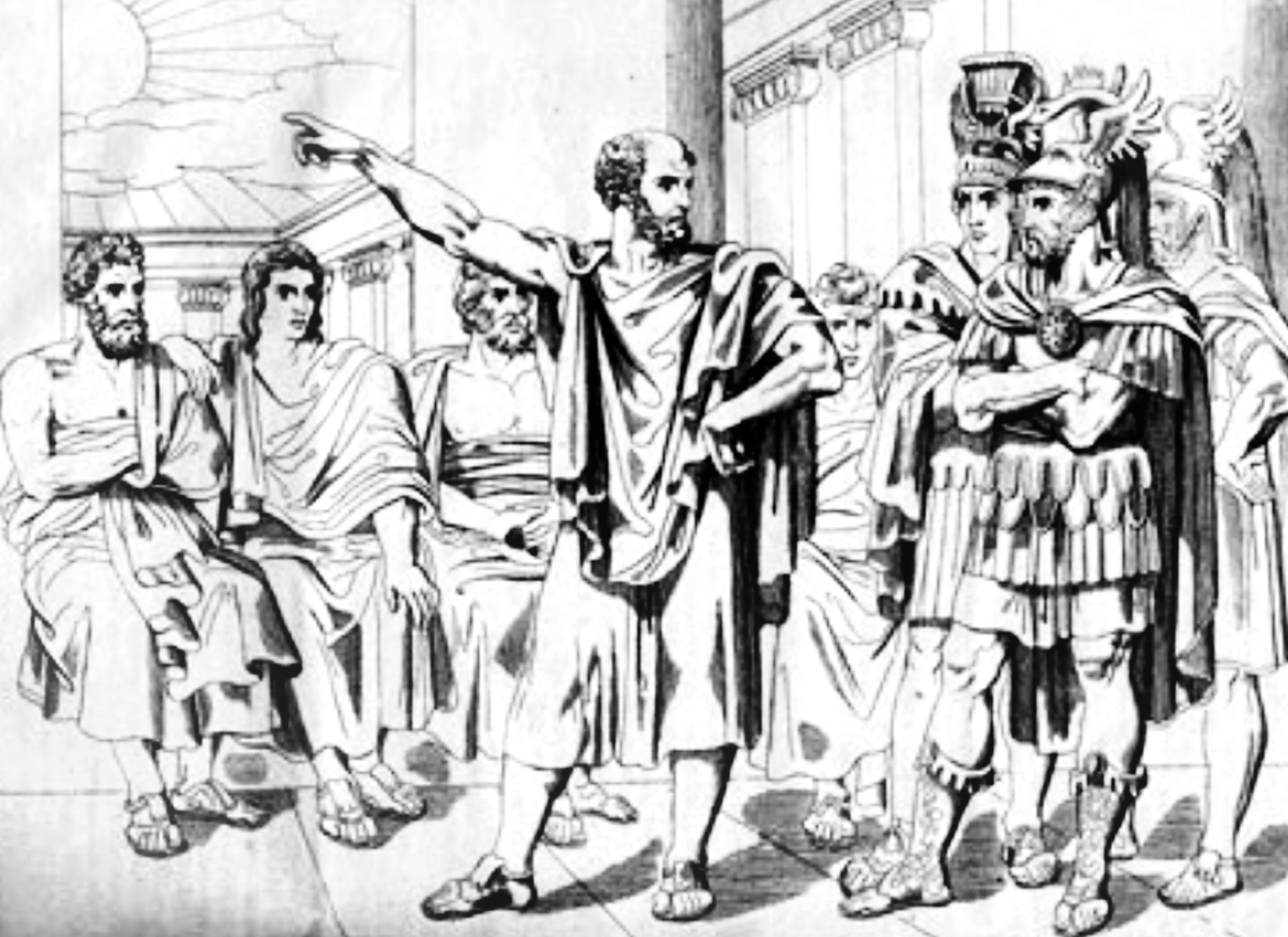
Answer of the Athenian Aristides to the ambassadors of Mardonius: "As long as the sun holds to its present course, we shall never come to terms with Xerxes".

Mardonius there chose out first all the Persians called Immortals, save only Hydarnes their general, who said that he would not quit the king's person; and next, the Persian cuirassiers, and the thousand horse, and the Medes and Sacae and Bactrians and Indians, alike their footmen and the rest of the horsemen. He chose these nations entire; of the rest of his allies he picked out a few from each people, the goodliest men and those that he knew to have done some good service... Thereby the whole number, with the horsemen, grew to three hundred thousand men.

— Herodotus VIII, 113.

Mardonius captured and sacked Athens, which had been deserted before the Battle of Salamis. He offered to return Athens and help rebuild the city if the Athenians would accept a truce, but the Athenians rejected the truce and prepared for another battle.

==== Battle of Plataea ====
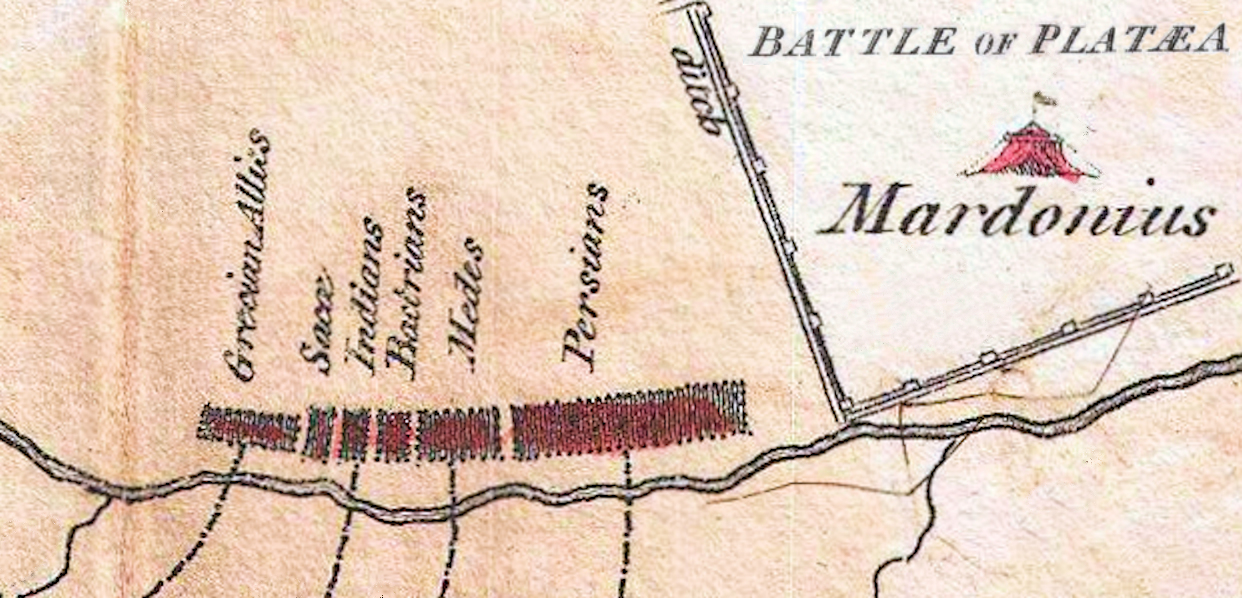
Camp of Mardonius and disposition of Achaemenid troops at the Battle of Plataea (479 BC), in which Mardonius was killed. From left to right: Greek allies, Sacae, Indians, Bactrians, Medes and Persians.

Mardonius prepared to meet them at Plataea, despite the opposition from another Persian commander, Artabazus, who, like Artabanus, did not think that the Persian army could automatically defeat the Greeks. Mardonius was killed in the ensuing battle by the Spartans. It is claimed by Herodotus and Plutarch a Spartan called Aeimnestus killed Mardonius. This led to his army breaking up.

Herodotus relates of the Spartan leader Pausanias’ response when an Aeginetan suggests mounting on a pole the head of the slain Persian general Mardonius, as Xerxes had wanted to do to Leonidas after the battle of Thermopylae—a suggestion taken by Pausanias to threaten the very root of civilization: "Such doings befit barbarians rather than Greeks, and even in barbarians we detest them...Come not before me again with such a speech nor with such counsel, and thank my forbearance that you are not now punished".
