= Datis =

5th-century BC Median/Persian admiral

- *Dātiya-
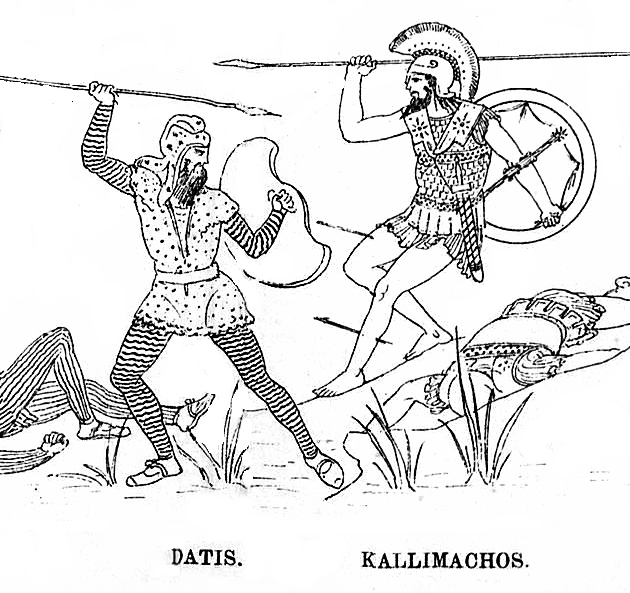
- Datis fighting Kallimachos at the Battle of Marathon, in the Stoa Poikile (reconstitution)
- Born: Media, Achaemenid Empire
- Military career
- Allegiance: Achaemenid Empire
- Conflicts: Ionian Revolt: Battle of Lade; First Persian invasion of Greece: Siege of Eretria; Battle of Marathon

Datis or Datus (Greek: Δάτης, Old Iranian: *Dātiya-, Achaemenid Elamite: Da-ti-ya) was a Median noble and admiral who served the Persian Empire during the reign of Darius the Great (522–486 BC). He is known for his role in leading the Persian amphibious expedition against Greece in 490 BC during the Greco-Persian Wars. Along with Darius's nephew Artaphernes, he was tasked with subduing Eretria and Athens, succeeding the previously defeated Mardonius.

While some later sources claim Datis died during the Battle of Marathon (490), this is not corroborated by other evidence. His later career is largely unknown except that his sons served as cavalry leaders under Xerxes I (486–465 BC). Datis was familiar with Greek affairs, maintained connections with Greek officials, respected Greek deities, and even attempted to speak Greek.

== Name ==
The personal name Datis (Greek Dâtis) derives from the Old Iranian *Dātiya-, as evidenced by the Elamite equivalent Da-ti-ya and by the Greek form -is, which reflects the Old Persian ending -iya- (as in Bṛdiya-/Smérdis).

== Biography ==
Datis served as a commander during the Ionian Revolt (499–493 BC), and likely coordinated efforts to suppress the revolt during the Battle of Lade in early 494 BC.

During the Greco-Persian Wars, Datis and Artaphernes replaced the commander Mardonius, whose ships had fallen victim to a huge storm when sailing round Mount Athos. Datis was ordered to reduce Athens and Eretria to slavery, and bring the Greek slaves before the Achaemenid king. To achieve this, Datis sought to establish a bridgehead on the eastern coast of Greece.

In 490 BCE, Datis sailed from the Ionian shoreline to Samos, and then he travelled through the Icarian sea to the islands of Delos and Naxos. When Datis arrived the inhabitants of the islands fled. Datis then sent the inhabitants a message telling them he did not seek to harm them. Datis burnt large amounts of incense at the altar of Apollo.

Datis's forces travelled along the Greek coast taking town after town. One town named Carystus resisted Datis. So his army of 80,000 soldiers and 200 triremes lay siege to the city. He began the siege by destroying the crops around the city. Eventually, the city was overwhelmed and surrendered.

During Datis's siege of Eretria in 490 BCE, the Eretrians had many conflicting strategies. Some Eretrians wished to surrender the city and wage guerrilla warfare in the mountains of Greece. Some Eretrians wanted to surrender the city to the Persians. Four thousand Athenian colonists arrived from Chalcis to help defend Eretria. Datis attacked the Eretrians in battle, resulting in high numbers of casualties. On the seventh day of the siege the Eretrians surrendered, and all of the temples in the city were burned to exact revenge for the earlier burning of Sardis by the Greeks. It is very likely one of the temples destroyed was the temple of Apollo Daphnephoros.

Datis commanded the Persian assault force against the Athenians at the Battle of Marathon in the same year. Ctesias of Cnidus relates that Datis was slain at Marathon and that the Athenians refused to hand over his body. However, this conflicts with Herodotus' claim that Datis survived the battle.

== Family ==
Datis had two sons named Harmamithres and Tithaeus. Both of his children became cavalry officers and served under Xerxes I.
