= Artaphernes (nephew of Darius I) =

5th-century Persian general and satrap

Military service
- Allegiance: Achaemenid Empire
- Battles/wars: First Persian invasion of Greece; Siege of Eretria; Battle of Marathon; Second Persian invasion of Greece

Artaphernes (Greek: Ἀρταφέρνης, Old Persian: Artafarna, from Median Rtafarnah), son of Artaphernes, was the nephew of Darius the Great, and a general of the Achaemenid Empire.

He was appointed, together with Datis, to take command of the expedition sent by Darius to punish Athens and Eretria for their support for the Ionian Revolt. Artaphernes and Datis besieged and destroyed Eretria, but were beaten by the Athenians at the Battle of Marathon in 490 BC.

Ten years later, Artaphernes is recorded as being in command of the Lydians and Mysians in the Second Persian invasion of Greece.

== See also ==
- Artaphernes
- Greco-Persian Wars
- Battle of Marathon
- Darius I of Persia
