= First Persian invasion of Greece =

492–490 BC phase of the Greco-Persian Wars

- Part of the Greco-Persian Wars
- Key sites in Greece during the first Persian invasion
Date	492–490 BC
Location	Thrace, Macedonia, Halkidiki, Dodecanese, Cyclades, Euboea, Attica
Result	Persian victory
Territorial changes	Persia fails to conquer Attica, but it conquers Macedon and Eretria and the Cycladic Islands and other islands, suppressed the Ionian Revolt, re-subjugates Thrace, and establishes naval supremacy over the Aegean Sea

Belligerents
Athens; Eretria; Plataea; Naxos; Sparta; Lindus; Other Greek city-states	Achaemenid Empire

Commanders and leaders
Miltiades the Younger; Callimachus †; Stesilaos †; Cynaegirus †; Cleomenes I	Darius the Great; Mardonius; Datis; Artaphernes

Strength
8,000–9,000 Athenians; 1,000 Plataeans; Total: 9,000-10,000	10,000 Immortals; 10,000 light infantry 5,000 archers 1,000–3,000 cavalry 600 triremes 100,000 oarsmen (non-combatants); Total: 26,000–28,000

Casualties and losses
Invasion of Athens: Herodotus: 192 Athenians killed 11 Plataeans killed Eretria enslaved Naxos looted Unknown losses for other states	Invasion of Athens: Herodotus: 6,400 Persians killed at the Battle of Marathon; 7 ships sunk Other estimates: 1,000–2,000 killed Unknown losses during entire campaign

The first Persian invasion of Greece took place from 492 BC to 490 BC, as part of the Greco-Persian Wars. Although the Achaemenid empire were defeated by the Athenian at the Battle of Marathon, they emerged victorious in most of their battles against the Greeks and achieved the majority of their objectives. Consisting of two distinct campaigns, the invasion of the independent Greek city-states was ordered by the Persian king Darius the Great, who sought to punish Athens and Eretria after they had supported the earlier Ionian Revolt. Additionally, Darius also saw the subjugation of Greece as an opportunity to expand into Southeast Europe and thereby ensure the security of the Achaemenid Empire's western frontier.

The first campaign, in 492 BC, was led by the Persian commander Mardonius, who re-subjugated Thrace and forced Macedon to become a fully subordinate client kingdom within the Achaemenid Empire; it had been a Persian vassal as early as the late 6th century BC—probably in 512 BC. However, further progress was prevented when Mardonius' fleet was wrecked in a storm off the coast of Mount Athos. The following year, having demonstrated his intentions, Darius sent envoys to all parts of Greece, demanding their submission. He received it from almost all of them, but not from Athens and Sparta, both of which executed the envoys sent to them. With Athens still defiant, and Sparta now effectively at war with the Persians, Darius ordered a further military campaign for the following year.

The second Persian campaign, in 490 BC, was led by the Persian commanders Datis and Artaphernes. The expedition headed first to Naxos, which was captured and burned, and then leapfrogged between the rest of the Cycladic Islands, annexing each of them into the Achaemenid Empire. Reaching Greece, they landed at Eretria, which they besieged, and after a brief time, captured. The Eretrians were enslaved and their city was burned. Finally, the expedition headed to Attica, landing at Marathon, en route to Athens. There, they were met by a smaller Athenian army, which nevertheless proceeded to secure for itself a remarkable victory.

This defeat prevented the successful conclusion of the campaign, and the Persian expedition returned to West Asia, though they had fulfilled most of their aims, successfully punishing Naxos and Eretria and bringing much of the Aegean under Persian rule, as well as fully integrating Macedon. The unfinished business from this campaign led Darius to prepare for a much larger invasion of Greece, aimed at firmly subjugating it and punishing Athens and Sparta. However, internal strife within the Achaemenid Empire delayed this expedition, and Darius then died of old age. It was thus left to his son Xerxes I to lead the second Persian invasion of Greece, which began in 480 BC.

== Sources ==
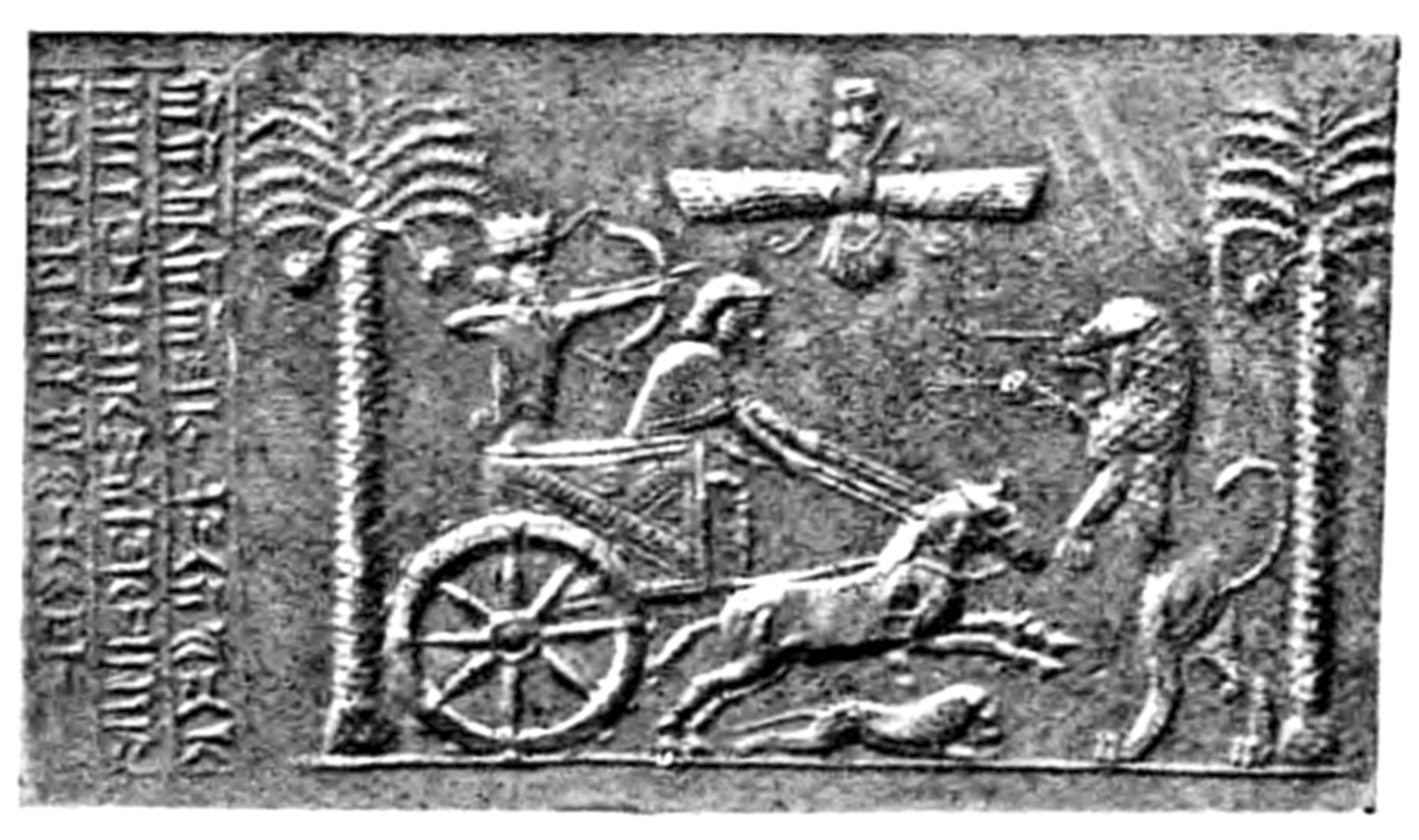
Seal of King Darius the Great hunting in a chariot, reading "I am Darius, the Great King", in Old Persian, Elamite and Babylonian. British Museum.

The main source for the Greco-Persian Wars is the Greek historian Herodotus. Herodotus, who has been called the 'Father of History', was born in 484 BC in Halicarnassus, Asia Minor (then under Persian overlordship). He wrote his 'Enquiries' (Greek—Historia; English—(The) Histories) around 440–430 BC, trying to trace the origins of the Greco-Persian Wars, which would still have been relatively recent history (the wars finally ending in 450 BC). Herodotus's approach was entirely novel, and at least in Western society, he does seem to have invented 'history' as we know it. As the British author Tom Holland has it: "For the first time, a chronicler set himself to trace the origins of a conflict not to a past so remote so as to be utterly fabulous, nor to the whims and wishes of some god, nor to a people's claim to manifest destiny, but rather explanations he could verify personally."

Some subsequent ancient historians, despite following in his footsteps, criticised Herodotus, starting with Thucydides. Nevertheless, Thucydides chose to begin his history where Herodotus left off (at the siege of Sestos), and therefore evidently felt that Herodotus's history was accurate enough not to need re-writing or correcting. Plutarch criticised Herodotus in his essay "On The Malignity of Herodotus", describing Herodotus as "Philobarbaros" (barbarian-lover), for not being pro-Greek enough, which suggests that Herodotus might actually have done a reasonable job of being even-handed. A negative view of Herodotus was passed on to Renaissance Europe, though he remained well read. However, since the 19th century his reputation has been dramatically rehabilitated by archaeological finds which have repeatedly confirmed his version of events. The prevailing modern view is that Herodotus generally did a remarkable job in his Historia, but that some of his specific details (particularly troop numbers and dates) should be viewed with skepticism. Nevertheless, there are still some historians who believe Herodotus made up much of his story.

The Sicilian historian Diodorus Siculus, writing in the 1st century BC in his Bibliotheca Historica, also provides an account of the Greco-Persian wars, partially derived from the earlier Greek historian Ephorus. This account is fairly consistent with Herodotus's. The Greco-Persian wars are also described in less detail by a number of other ancient historians including Plutarch, Ctesias of Cnidus, and are alluded by other authors, such as the playwright Aeschylus. Archaeological evidence, such as the Serpent Column, also supports some of Herodotus's specific claims.

== Background ==
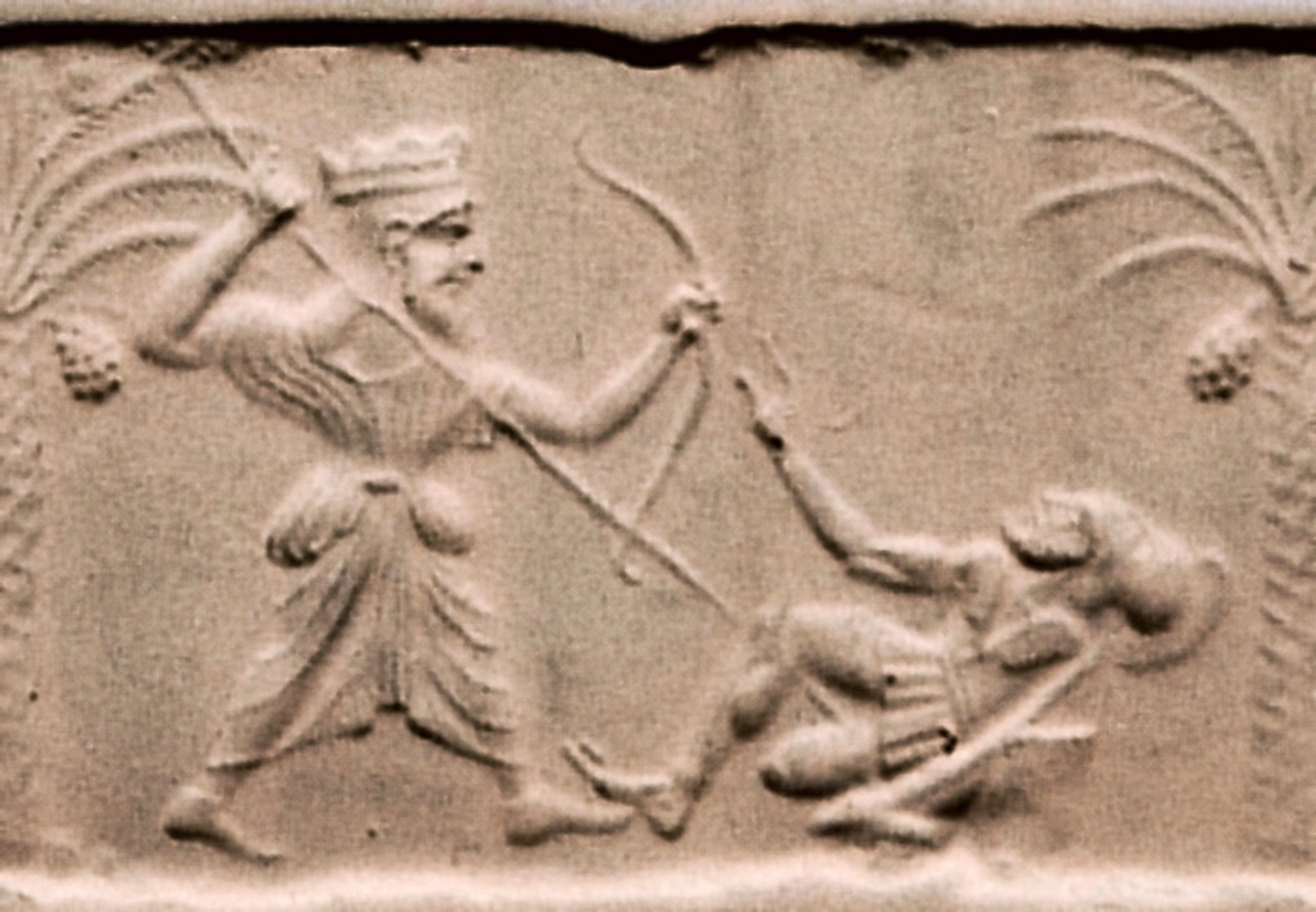
Achaemenid king killing a Greek hoplite. Circa 500–475 BC. Metropolitan Museum of Art.

The first Persian invasion of Greece had its immediate roots in the Ionian Revolt, the earliest phase of the Greco-Persian Wars. However, it was also the result of the longer-term interaction between the Greeks and Persians. In 500 BC the Persian Empire was still relatively young and highly expansionist, but prone to revolts amongst its subject peoples. Moreover, the Persian king Darius was a usurper, and had spent considerable time extinguishing revolts against his rule. Even before the Ionian Revolt, Darius had begun to expand the Empire into Europe, subjugating Thrace, expanding past the Danube river, conquering Paeonia, and forcing Macedon to become a client kingdom to Persia; though the latter retaining an amount of autonomy up to 492 BC. Attempts at further expansion into the politically fractious world of Ancient Greece may have been inevitable. However, the Ionian Revolt had directly threatened the integrity of the Persian empire, and the states of mainland Greece remained a potential menace to its future stability. Darius thus resolved to subjugate and pacify Greece and the Aegean, and to punish those involved in the Ionian Revolt.

The Ionian revolt had begun with an unsuccessful expedition against Naxos, a joint venture between the Persian satrap Artaphernes and the Miletus tyrant Aristagoras. In the aftermath, Artaphernes decided to remove Aristagoras from power, but before he could do so, Aristagoras abdicated, and declared Miletus a democracy. The other Ionian cities, ripe for rebellion, followed suit, ejecting their Persian-appointed tyrants, and declaring themselves democracies. Aristagoras then appealed to the states of Mainland Greece for support, but only Athens and Eretria offered to send troops.

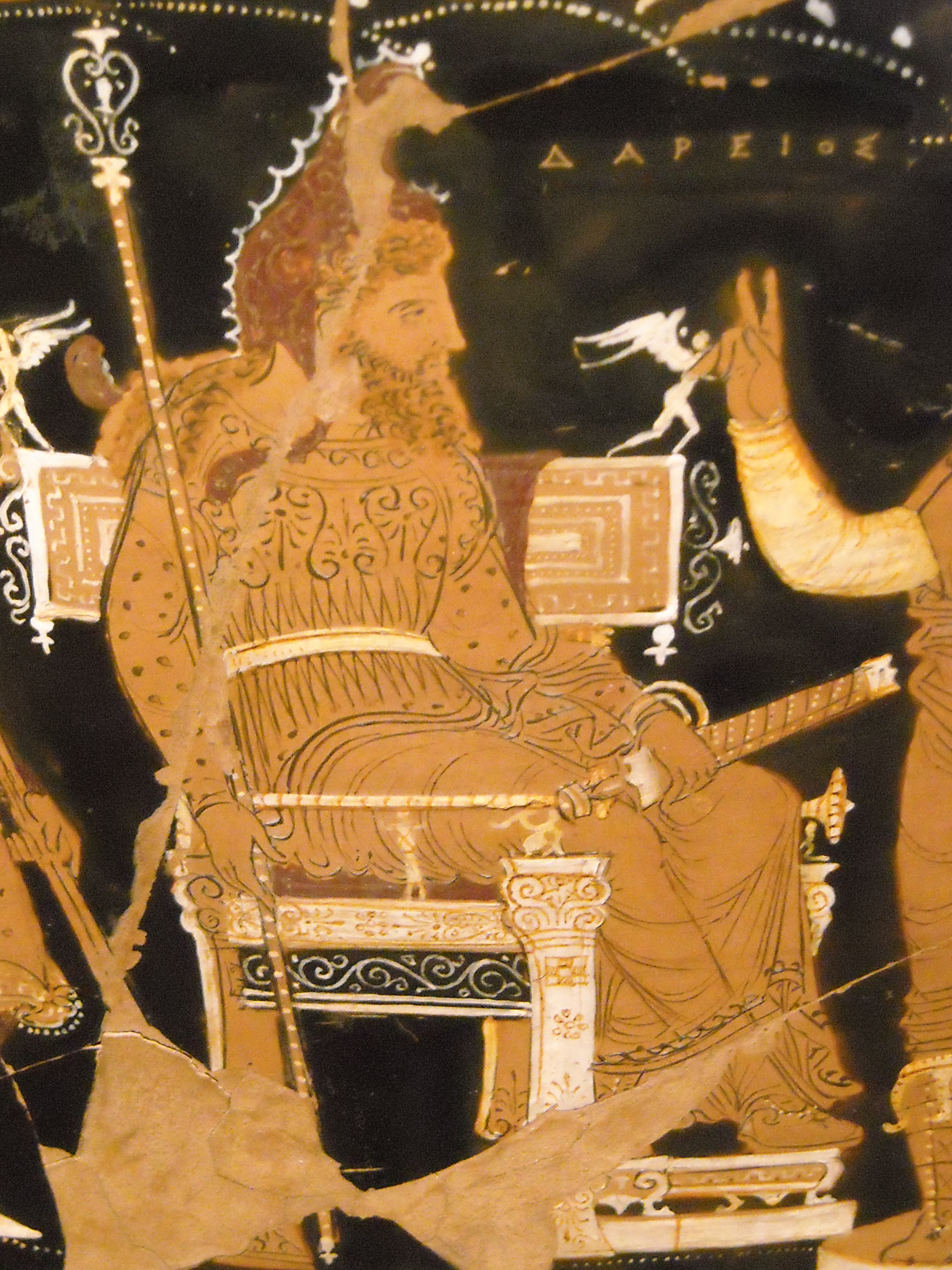
Drawing of Darius the Great and its inscription (ΔΑΡΕΙΟΣ, top right) on the "Darius Vase"

The involvement of Athens in the Ionian Revolt arose from a complex set of circumstances, beginning with the establishment of the Athenian Democracy in the late 6th century BC. In 510 BC, with the aid of Cleomenes I, King of Sparta, the Athenian people had expelled Hippias, the tyrant ruler of Athens. With Hippias's father Peisistratus, the family had ruled for 36 out of the previous 50 years and fully intended to continue Hippias's rule. Hippias fled to Sardis to the court of the Persian satrap, Artaphernes, and promised control of Athens to the Persians if they were to help restore him. In the meantime, Cleomenes helped install a pro-Spartan tyranny under Isagoras in Athens, in opposition to Cleisthenes, the leader of the traditionally powerful Alcmaeonidae family, who considered themselves the natural heirs to the rule of Athens. In a daring response, Cleisthenes proposed to the Athenian people that he would establish a 'democracy' in Athens, much to the horror of the rest of the aristocracy. Cleisthenes's reasons for suggesting such a radical course of action, which would remove much of his own family's power, are unclear; perhaps he perceived that days of aristocratic rule were coming to an end anyway; certainly he wished to prevent Athens becoming a puppet of Sparta by whatever means necessary. However, as a result of this proposal, Cleisthenes and his family were exiled from Athens, in addition to other dissenting elements, by Isagoras. Having been promised democracy however, the Athenian people seized the moment and revolted, expelling Cleomenes and Isagoras. Cleisthenes was thus restored to Athens (507 BC), and at breakneck speed began to establish democratic government. The establishment of democracy revolutionised Athens, which henceforth became one of the leading cities in Greece. The new-found freedom and self-governance of the Athenians meant that they were thereafter exceptionally hostile to the return of the tyranny of Hippias, or any form of outside subjugation; by Sparta, Persia or anyone else.

Cleomenes, unsurprisingly, was not pleased with events, and marched on Athens with the Spartan army. Cleomenes's attempts to restore Isagoras to Athens ended in a debacle, but fearing the worst, the Athenians had by this point already sent an embassy to Artaphernes in Sardis, to request aid from the Persian Empire. Artaphernes requested that the Athenians give him an 'earth and water', a traditional token of submission, which the Athenian ambassadors acquiesced to. However, they were severely censured for this when they returned to Athens. At some point later Cleomenes instigated a plot to restore Hippias to the rule of Athens. This failed and Hippias again fled to Sardis and tried to persuade the Persians to subjugate Athens. The Athenians dispatched ambassadors to Artaphernes to dissuade him from taking action, but Artaphernes merely instructed the Athenians to take Hippias back as tyrant. Needless to say, the Athenians balked at this, and resolved instead to be openly at war with Persia. Having thus become the enemy of Persia, Athens was already in a position to support the Ionian cities when they began their revolt. The fact that the Ionian democracies were inspired by the example of Athens no doubt further persuaded the Athenians to support the Ionian Revolt; especially since the cities of Ionia were (supposedly) originally Athenian colonies.

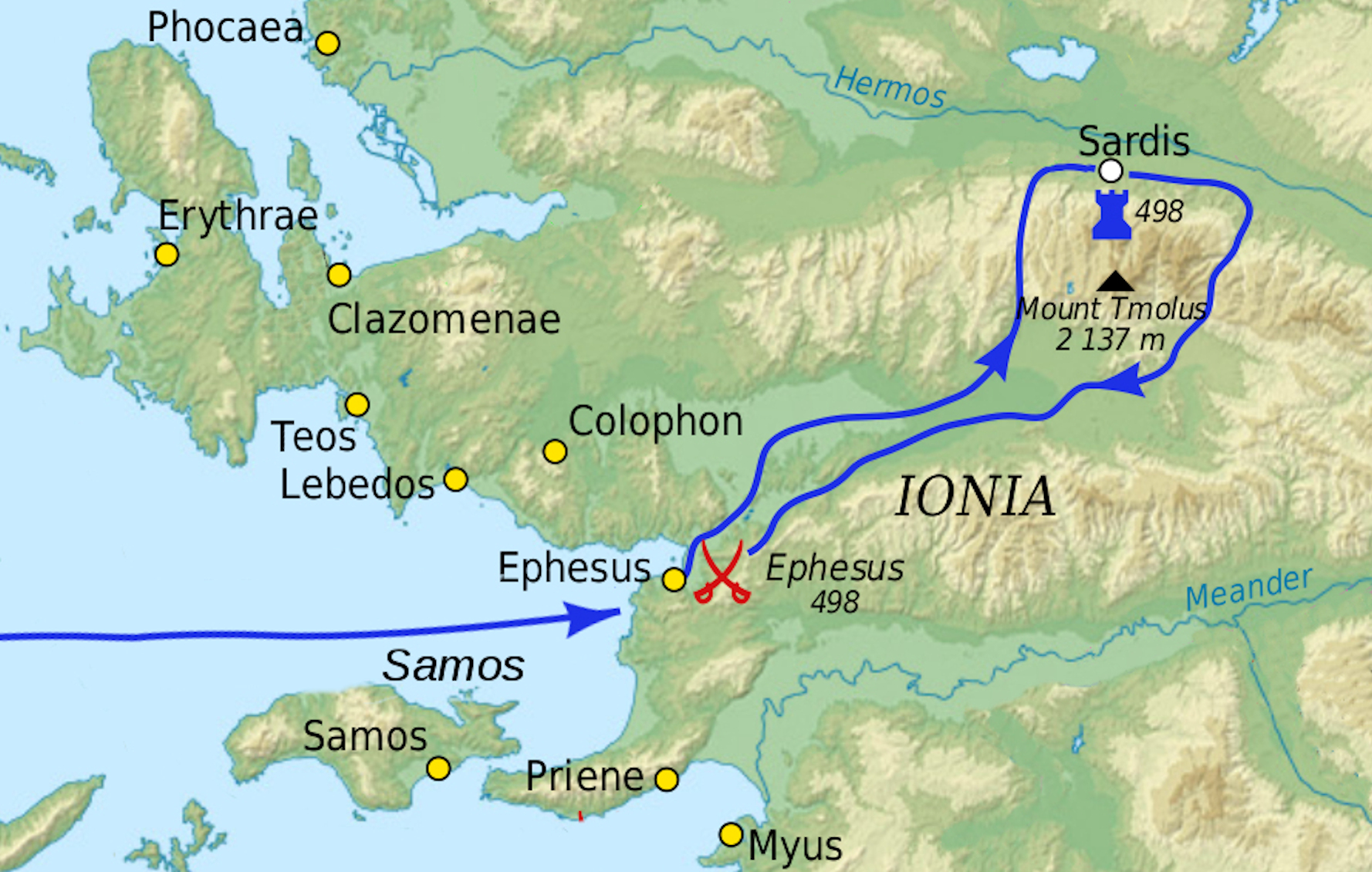
The Athenians led a campaign against the Achaemenid capital of Sardis in Asia Minor in 498 BC, during the Ionian revolt.

The city of Eretria also sent assistance to the Ionians for reasons that are not completely clear. Possibly commercial reasons were a factor; Eretria was a mercantile city, whose trade was threatened by Persian dominance of the Aegean. Herodotus suggests that the Eretrians supported the revolt in order to repay the support the Milesians had given Eretria in a past war against Chalcis.

The Athenians and Eretrians sent a task force of 25 triremes to Asia Minor. Whilst there, the Greek army surprised and outmaneuvered Artaphernes, marching to Sardis and there burning the lower city. However, this was as much as the Greeks achieved, and they were then pursued back to the coast by Persian horsemen, losing many men in the process. Despite the fact their actions were ultimately fruitless, the Eretrians and in particular the Athenians had earned Darius's lasting enmity, and he vowed to punish both cities. The Persian naval victory at the Battle of Lade (494 BC) all but ended the Ionian Revolt, and by 493 BC, the last hold-outs were vanquished by the Persian fleet. The revolt was used as an opportunity by Darius to extend the empire's border to the islands of the East Aegean and the Propontis, which had not been part of the Persian dominions before. The completion of the pacification of Ionia allowed the Persians to begin planning their next moves; to extinguish the threat to the empire from Greece, and to punish Athens and Eretria.

== 492 BC: Mardonius' campaign ==
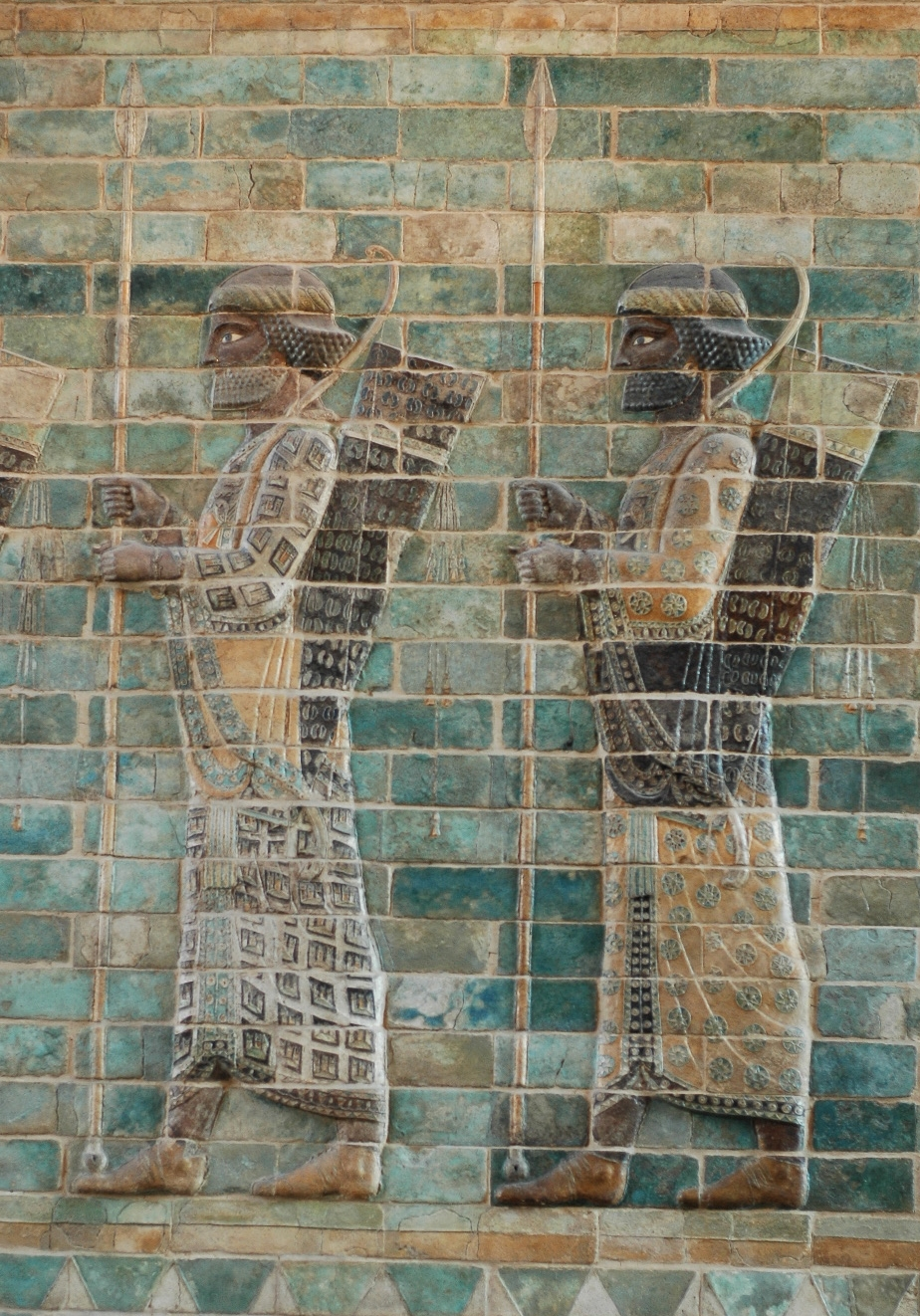
Persian warriors, possibly Immortals, a frieze in Darius's palace at Susa. Siliceous glazed bricks, c. 510 BC, Louvre

In the spring of 492 BC an expeditionary force, to be commanded by Darius's son-in-law Mardonius, was assembled, consisting of a fleet and a land army. Whilst the ultimate aim was to punish Athens and Eretria, the expedition also aimed to subdue as many of the Greek cities as possible. Departing from Cilicia, Mardonius sent the army to march to the Hellespont, whilst he travelled with the fleet. He sailed round the coast of Asia Minor to Ionia, where he spent a short time abolishing the tyrannies that ruled the cities of Ionia. Ironically, since the establishment of democracies had been a key factor in the Ionian Revolt, he replaced the tyrannies with democracies. Mardonius' establishment of democracy here can be seen as a bid to pacify Ionia, allowing his flank to be protected as he advanced towards the Hellespont and then onto Athens and Eretria.

Thence the fleet continued on to the Hellespont, and when all was ready, shipped the land forces across to Europe. The army then marched through Thrace, re-subjugating it, since these lands had already been added to the Persian Empire in 512 BC, during Darius's campaign against the Scythians. Upon reaching Macedon, the Persians forced it to become a fully subordinate part of the Persian Empire; they had been vassals of the Persians since the late 6th century BC, but retained their general autonomy.

Meanwhile, the fleet crossed to Thasos, resulting in the Thasians submitting to the Persians. The fleet then rounded the coastline as far as Acanthus in Chalcidice, before attempting to round the headland of Mount Athos. However, they were caught in a violent storm, which drove them against the coastline of Athos, wrecking (according to Herodotus) 300 ships, with the loss of 20,000 men.

Then, whilst the army was camped in Macedon, the Brygians, a local Thracian tribe, launched a night raid against the Persian camp, killing many of the Persians, and wounding Mardonius. Despite his injury, Mardonius made sure that the Brygians were defeated and subjugated, before leading his army back to the Hellespont; the remnants of the navy also retreated to Asia. Although this campaign ended ingloriously, the land approaches to Greece had been secured, and the Greeks had no doubt been made aware of Darius's intentions for them.

== 491 BC: Diplomacy ==
Perhaps reasoning that the expedition of the previous year may have made his plans for Greece obvious, and weakened the resolve of the Greek cities, Darius turned to diplomacy in 491 BC. He sent ambassadors to all the Greek city states, asking for "earth and water", a traditional token of submission. The vast majority of cities did as asked, fearing the wrath of Darius. In Athens, however, the ambassadors were put on trial and then executed; in Sparta, they were simply thrown down a well. This firmly and finally drew the battle-lines for the coming conflict; Sparta and Athens, despite their recent enmity, would together fight the Persians.

However, Sparta was then thrown into disarray by internal machinations. The citizens of Aegina had submitted to the Persian ambassadors, and the Athenians, troubled by the possibility of Persia using Aegina as a naval base, asked Sparta to intervene. Cleomenes travelled to Aegina to confront the Aeginetans personally, but they appealed to Cleomenes's fellow king Demaratus, who supported their stance. Cleomenes responded by having Demaratus declared illegitimate, with the help of the priests at Delphi (whom he bribed); Demaratus was replaced by his cousin Leotychides. Now faced with two Spartan kings, the Aeginetans capitulated, and handed over hostages to the Athenians as a guarantee of their good behaviour. However, in Sparta news emerged of the bribes Cleomenes had given at Delphi, and he was expelled from the city. He then sought to rally the northern Peloponnesus to his cause, at which the Spartans relented, and invited him back to the city. By 491 BC though, Cleomenes was widely considered insane and was sentenced to prison where he was found dead the following day. Cleomenes was succeeded by his half-brother Leonidas I.

== 490 BC: Datis and Artaphernes' campaign ==
Taking advantage of the chaos in Sparta, which effectively left Athens isolated, Darius decided to launch an amphibious expedition to finally punish Athens and Eretria. An army was assembled in Susa, and marched into Cilicia, where a fleet had been gathered. Command of the expedition was given to Datis the Mede and Artaphernes, son of the satrap Artaphernes.

=== Size of the Persian force ===
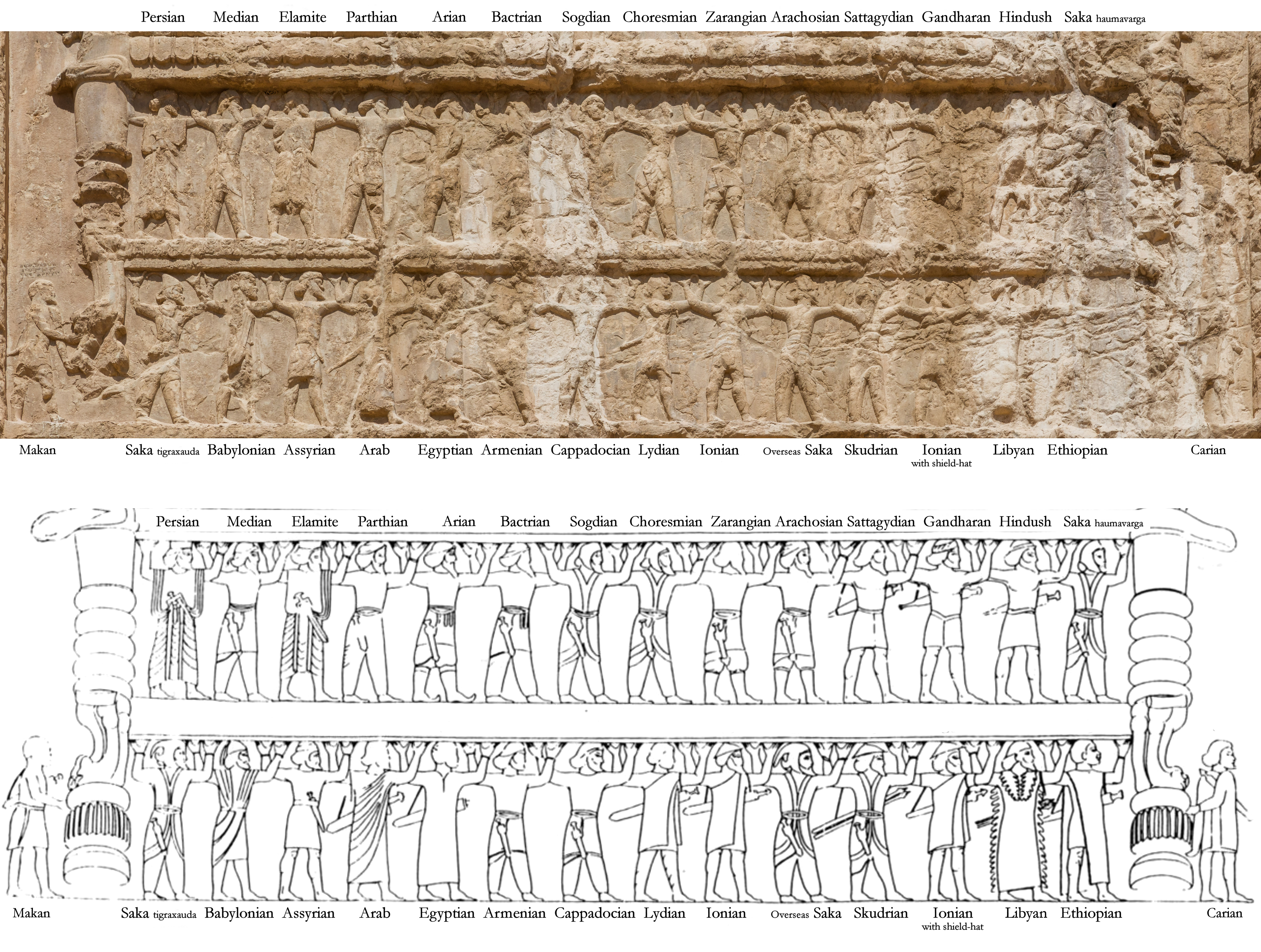
The various soldiers of the army of Darius I are illustrated on the tomb of Darius I at Naqsh-e Rostam, with a mention of each ethnicity in individual labels. The ethnicities are, in order: Makan, Persian, Median, Elamite, Parthian, Arian, Bactrian, Sogdian, Choresmian, Zarangian, Arachosian, Sattagydian, Gandharan, Hindush (Indian), Saka (haumavarga), Saka (tigraxauda), Babylonian, Assyrian, Arab, Egyptian, Armenian, Cappadocian, Lydian, Ionian, Saka beyond the sea, Skudrian (Thracian), Macedonian, Libyan, Nubian, Carian. Identical depictions were made on the tombs of other Achaemenid emperors, the best preserved frieze being that of Xerxes I.

According to Herodotus, the fleet sent by Darius consisted of 600 triremes. There is no indication in the historical sources of how many transport ships accompanied them, if any. Herodotus claimed that 3,000 transport ships accompanied 1,207 triremes during Xerxes' invasion in 480 BC. Among modern historians, some have accepted this number of ships as reasonable; it has been suggested either that the number 600 represents the combined number of triremes and transport ships, or that there were horse transports in addition to 600 triremes.

Herodotus does not estimate the size of the Persian army, only saying that they formed a "great and well-furnished army". Among other ancient sources, the poet Simonides, a near-contemporary, says the campaign force numbered 200,000, while a later writer, the Roman Cornelius Nepos estimates 200,000 infantry and 10,000 cavalry. Plutarch and Pausanias both independently give 300,000, as does the Suda dictionary; Plato and Lysias assert 500,000; and Justin 600,000.

Modern historians generally dismiss these numbers as exaggerations. One approach to estimate the number of troops is to calculate the number of marines carried by 600 triremes. Herodotus tells us that each trireme in the second invasion of Greece carried 30 extra marines, in addition to a probable 14 standard marines. Thus, 600 triremes could easily have carried 18,000–26,000 infantry. Numbers proposed for the Persian infantry are in the range 18,000–100,000. However, the consensus is around 25,000.

The Persian infantry used in the invasion was probably a heterogeneous group drawn from across the empire. However, according to Herodotus, there was at least a general conformity in the type of armour and style of fighting. The troops were, generally speaking, armed with a bow, 'short spear' and sword, carried a wicker shield, and wore at most a leather jerkin. The one exception to this may have been the ethnic Persian troops, who may have worn a corslet of scale armour. Some contingents would have been armed somewhat differently; for instance, the Saka were renowned axemen. The 'elite' contingents of the Persian infantry seem to have been the ethnic Persians, Medians, Cissians and the Saka; Herodotus specifically mentions the presence of Persians and Saka at Marathon. The style of fighting used by the Persians was probably to stand off from an enemy, using their bows (or equivalent) to wear down the enemy before closing in to deliver the coup de grace with spear and sword.

They fought a long time at Marathon. In the center of the line the foreigners prevailed, where the Persians and Sacae were arrayed. The foreigners prevailed there and broke through in pursuit inland, but on each wing the Athenians and Plataeans prevailed. In victory they let the routed foreigners flee, and brought the wings together to fight those who had broken through the center. The Athenians prevailed, then followed the fleeing Persians and struck them down. When they reached the sea they demanded fire and laid hold of the Persian ships.

— Herodotus VI.113.

Estimates for the cavalry are usually in the 1,000–3,000 range. The Persian cavalry was usually provided by the ethnic Persians, Bactrians, Medes, Cissians, and Saka; most of these probably fought as lightly armed missile cavalry. The fleet must have had at least some proportion of transport ships, since the cavalry was carried by ship; whilst Herodotus claims the cavalry was carried in the triremes, this is improbable. Lazenby estimates 30–40 transport ships would be required to carry 1,000 cavalry.

=== Lindos ===
Once assembled, the Persian force sailed from Cilicia firstly to the island of Rhodes. A Lindian Temple Chronicle records that Datis besieged the city of Lindos, but was unsuccessful.

=== Naxos ===
The fleet then moved north along the Ionian coast towards Samos, before turning west into the Aegean Sea. The fleet sailed next to Naxos, in order to punish the Naxians for their resistance to the failed expedition that the Persians had mounted there a decade earlier. Many of the inhabitants fled to the mountains; according to Herodotus, those that the Persians caught were enslaved. The Persians then burnt the city and temples of the Naxians.

=== The Cyclades ===
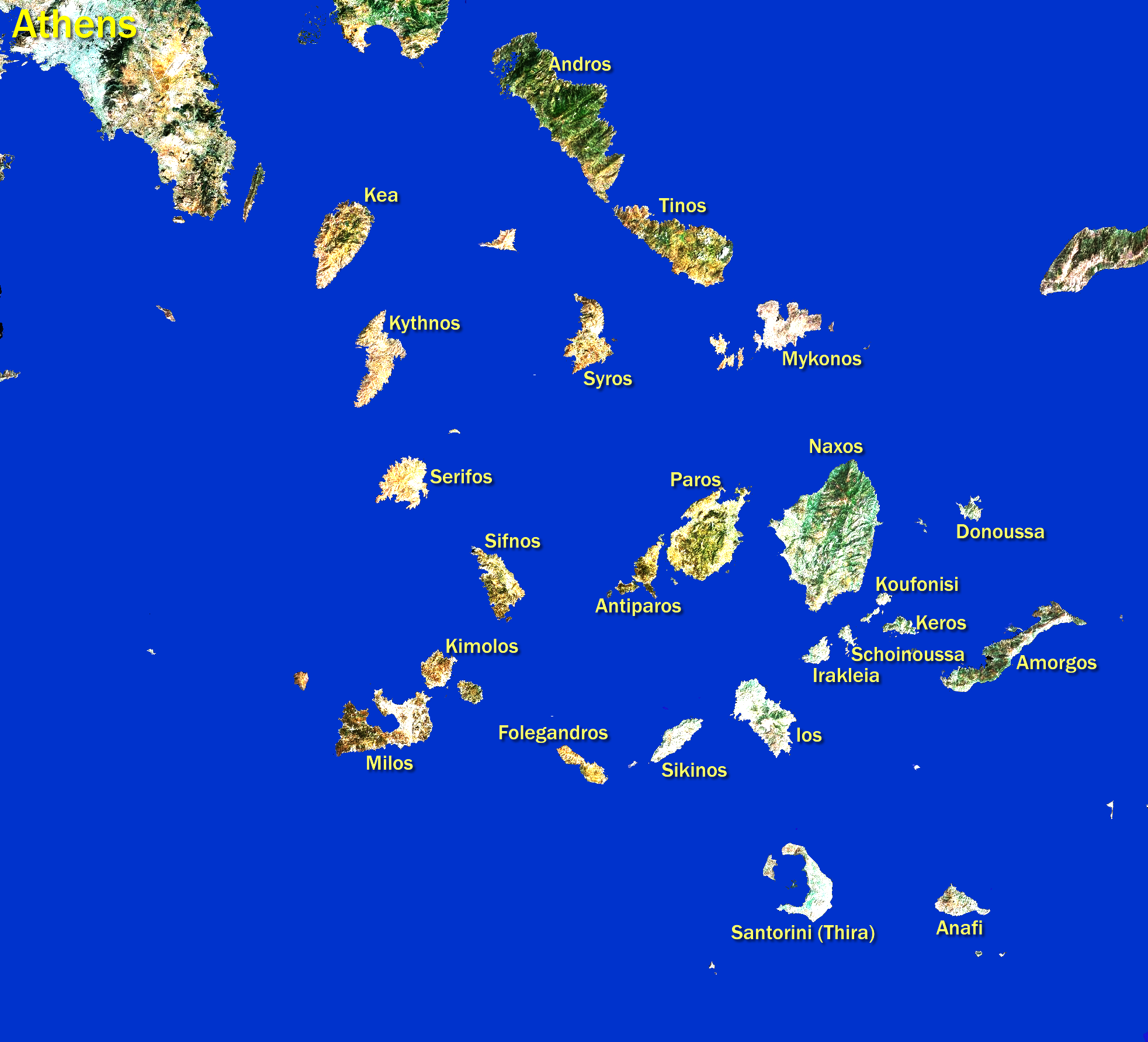
Satellite image of the Cyclades. Delos is the small island directly to the bottom-left of Mykonos

Moving on, the Persian fleet approached Delos, whereupon the Delians also fled from their homes. Having demonstrated Persian power at Naxos, Datis now intended to show clemency to the other islands, if they submitted to him. He sent a herald to the Delians, proclaiming:

"Holy men, why have you fled away, and so misjudged my intent? It is my own desire, and the king's command to me, to do no harm to the land where the two gods were born, neither to the land itself nor to its inhabitants. So return now to your homes and dwell on your island."

Datis then burned 300 talents of frankincense on the altar of Apollo on Delos, to show his respect for one of the gods of the island. The fleet then proceeded to island-hop across the rest of Aegean on its way to Eretria, taking hostages and troops from each island.

=== Karystos ===
The Persians finally arrived off the southern tip of Euboea, at Karystos. The citizens of Karystos refused to give hostages to the Persians, so they were besieged, and their land ravaged, until they submitted to the Persians.

=== Siege of Eretria ===
The task force then sailed around Euboea to the first major target, Eretria. According to Herodotus, the Eretrians were divided amongst themselves as to the best course of action; whether to flee to the highlands, or undergo a siege, or to submit to the Persians. In the event, the majority decision was to remain in the city. The Eretrians made no attempt to stop the Persians landing, or advancing, and thus allowed themselves to be besieged. For six days the Persians attacked the walls, with losses on both sides; however, on the seventh day two reputable Eretrians opened the gates and betrayed the city to the Persians. The city was razed, and temples and shrines were looted and burned. Furthermore, according to Darius's commands, the Persians enslaved all the remaining townspeople.

=== Battle of Marathon ===
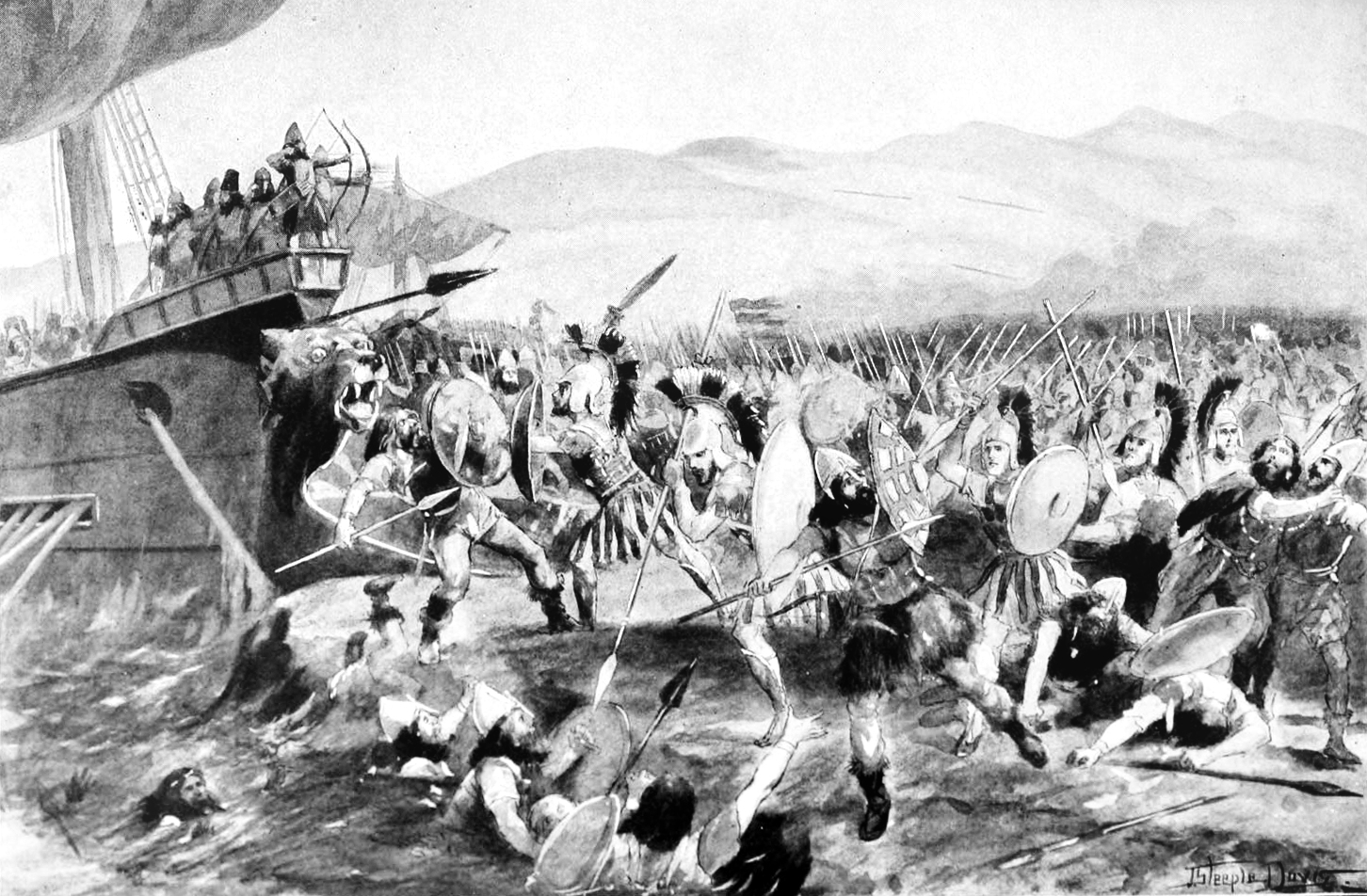
Battle of Marathon.

The Persian fleet next headed south down the coast of Attica, landing at the bay of Marathon, roughly forty kilometres (25 mi) from Athens, on the advice of Hippias, son of the former tyrant of Athens, Peisistratus. The Athenians, joined by a small force from Plataea, marched to Marathon, and succeeded in blocking the two exits from the plain of Marathon. At the same time, Athens' greatest runner, Pheidippides (or Philippides) was sent to Sparta to request that the Spartan army march to Athens' aid. Pheidippides arrived during the festival of Carneia, a sacrosanct period of peace, and was informed that the Spartan army could not march to war until the full moon rose; Athens could not expect reinforcement for at least ten days. They decided to hold out at Marathon for the time being, and they were reinforced by a contingent of hoplites from Plataea.

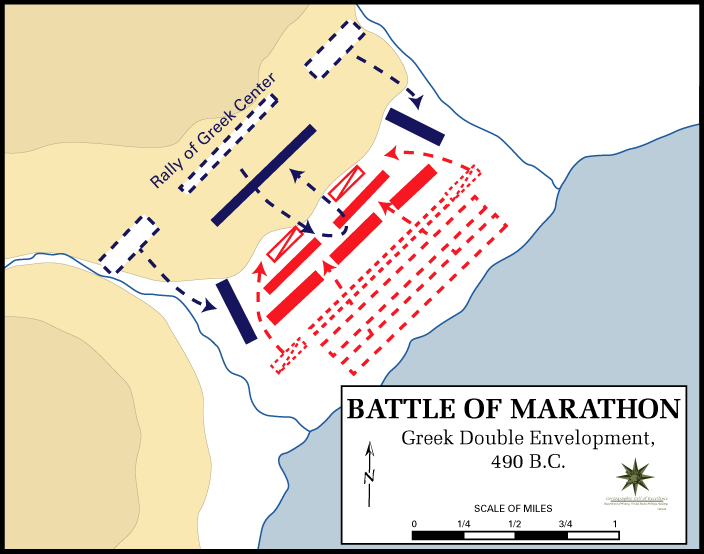
The Greek wings envelop the Persians

Stalemate ensued for five days, before the Athenians (for reasons that are not completely clear) decided to attack the Persians. Despite the numerical advantage of the Persians, the hoplites proved devastatingly effective, routing the Persians wings before turning in on the centre of the Persian line; the remnants of the Persian army left the battle and fled to their ships. Herodotus records that 6,400 Persian bodies were counted on the battlefield; the Athenians lost just 192 men and the Plataeans 11.

In the immediate aftermath of the battle, Herodotus says that the Persian fleet sailed around Cape Sunium to attack Athens directly, although some modern historians place this attempt just before the battle. Either way, the Athenians evidently realised that their city was still under threat, and marched as quickly as possible back to Athens. The Athenians arrived in time to prevent the Persians from securing a landing, and seeing that the opportunity was lost, the Persians turned about and returned to Asia. On the next day, the Spartan army arrived, having covered the 220 kilometers (140 mi) in only three days. The Spartans toured the battlefield at Marathon, and agreed that the Athenians had won a great victory.

== Aftermath ==
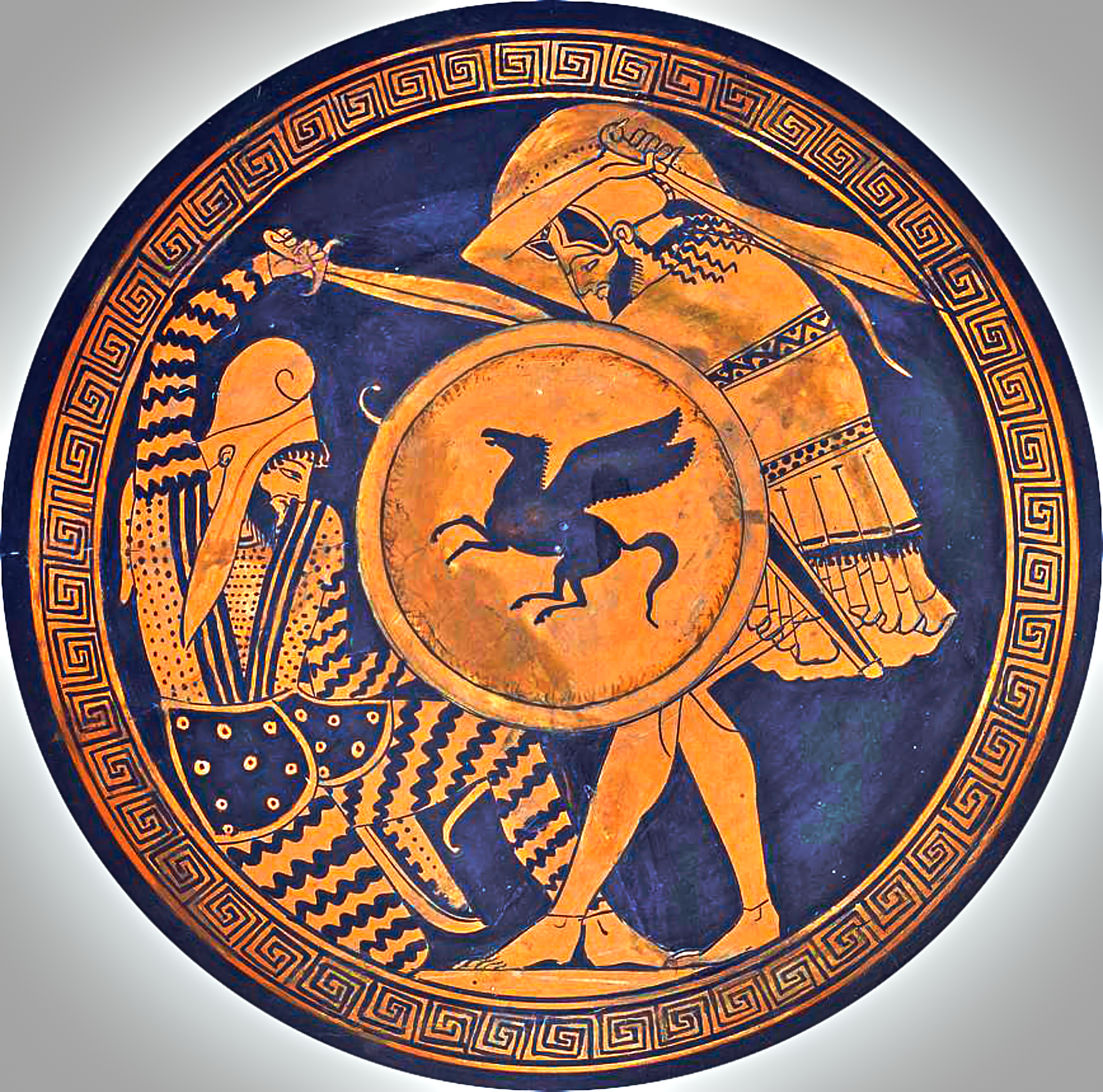
Greek hoplite and Persian warrior depicted fighting. 5th century BC

The defeat at Marathon ended for the time being the Persian invasion of Greece. However, Thrace and the Cycladic islands had been resubjugated into the Persian empire, and Macedon reduced to a subordinate kingdom part of the empire; since the late 6th century BC they had been vassals of the Persians, but remained having a broad scope of autonomy. Darius was still fully intent on conquering Greece, to secure the western part of his empire. Moreover, Athens remained unpunished for its role in the Ionian Revolt, and both Athens and Sparta were unpunished for their treatment of the Persian ambassadors.

Darius therefore began raising a huge new army with which he meant to completely subjugate Greece; however, in 486 BC, his Egyptian subjects revolted, indefinitely postponing any Greek expedition. Darius then died whilst preparing to march on Egypt, and the throne of Persia passed to his son Xerxes I. Xerxes crushed the Egyptian revolt, and very quickly restarted the preparations for the invasion of Greece. This expedition was finally ready by 480 BC, and the second Persian invasion of Greece thereby began, under the command of Xerxes himself.

== Significance ==
For the Persians, the two expeditions to Greece had been largely successful; new territories had been added to their empire and Eretria had been punished. It was only a minor setback that the invasion had met defeat at Marathon; that defeat barely dented the enormous resources of the Persian empire. Yet, for the Greeks, it was an enormously significant victory. It was the first time that Greeks had beaten the Persians, and showed them that the Persians were not invincible, and that resistance, rather than subjugation, was possible.

The victory at Marathon was a defining moment for the young Athenian democracy, showing what might be achieved through unity and self-belief; indeed, the battle effectively marks the start of a 'golden age' for Athens. This was also applicable to Greece as a whole; "their victory endowed the Greeks with a faith in their destiny that was to endure for three centuries, during which western culture was born". John Stuart Mill's famous opinion was that "the Battle of Marathon, even as an event in British history, is more important than the Battle of Hastings".

Militarily, a major lesson for the Greeks was the potential of the hoplite phalanx. This style had developed during internecine warfare amongst the Greeks; since each city-state fought in the same way, the advantages and disadvantages of the hoplite phalanx had not been obvious. Marathon was the first time a phalanx faced more lightly armed troops, and revealed how devastating the hoplites could be in battle. The phalanx formation was still vulnerable to cavalry (the cause of much caution by the Greek forces at the Battle of Plataea), but used in the right circumstances, it was now shown to be a potentially devastating weapon. The Persians seem to have more-or-less disregarded the military lessons of Marathon. The composition of infantry for the second invasion seems to have been the same as during the first, despite the availability of hoplites and other heavy infantry in Persian-ruled lands. Having won battles against hoplites previously, the Persians may simply have regarded Marathon as an aberration.

== Bibliography ==
=== Ancient sources ===
- Herodotus, The Histories
- Thucydides, History of the Peloponnesian War
- Diodorus Siculus, Library
- Lysias, Funeral Oration
- Plato, Menexenus
- Xenophon, Anabasis
- Cornelius Nepos, Lives of the Eminent Commanders (Miltiades)
- Plutarch, Parallel Lives (Aristides, Themistocles), On the Malice of Herodotus
- Pausanias, Description of Greece
- Marcus Junianus Justinus, Epitome of the Philippic History of Pompeius Trogus
- Photius, Bibliotheca or Myriobiblon: Epitome of Persica by Ctesias
- Suda lexicon

=== Modern sources ===
- Green, Peter (1996). The Greco-Persian Wars. University of California Press. ISBN 0-520-20313-5.
- Holland, Tom (2006). Persian Fire: The First World Empire and the Battle for the West. Abacus. ISBN 0-385-51311-9.
- Lazenby, JF. The Defence of Greece 490–479 BC. Aris & Phillips Ltd., 1993 ISBN 0-85668-591-7
- Lloyd, Alan. Marathon: The Crucial Battle That Created Western Democracy. Souvenir Press, 2005. ISBN 0-285-63688-X
- Davis, Paul. 100 Decisive Battles. Oxford University Press, 1999. ISBN 1-57607-075-1
- Higbie, C. The Lindian Chronicle and the Greek Creation of their Past. Oxford University Press, 2003. doi:10.1093/acprof:oso/9780199241910.001.0001 ISBN 978-0-199-24191-0
- Velichko, Konstantin; Novitsky, Vasily; Schwartz, Alexey von; Apushkin, Vladimir; Schoultz, Gustav von (1912). "ГРЕКО-ПЕРСИДСКИЯ ВОЙНЫ" [The Greco-Persian Wars]. Sytin Military Encyclopedia (in Russian). Vol. 8: Гимры-Двигатели судовые. Типография Т-ва И. Д. Сытина. pp. 468–469.
- Powell J., Blakeley D.W., Powell, T. Biographical Dictionary of Literary Influences: The Nineteenth Century, 1800–1914. Greenwood Publishing Group, 2001. ISBN 978-0-313-30422-4
- Fuller, J.F.C. A Military History of the Western World. Funk & Wagnalls, 1954.
- Fine, JVA. The Ancient Greeks: A Critical History. Harvard University Press, 1983 ISBN 0-674-03314-0
- Fehling, D. Herodotus and His "Sources": Citation, Invention, and Narrative Art. Translated by J.G. Howie. Leeds: Francis Cairns, 1989.
- Finley, Moses (1972). "Introduction". Thucydides – History of the Peloponnesian War (translated by Rex Warner). Penguin. ISBN 0-14-044039-9.
- Howe, Timothy; Reames, Jeanne (2008). Macedonian Legacies: Studies in Ancient Macedonian History and Culture in Honor of Eugene N. Borza. Regina Books. ISBN 978-1-930-05356-4.
- Ιστορία του Ελληνικού Έθνους (History of the Greek nation volume Β), Athens 1971.
- Kampouris, M. (2000). Η Μάχη του Μαραθώνα, το λυκαυγές της κλασσικής Ελλάδος (The battle of Marathon, the dawn of classical Greece). Πόλεμος και ιστορία (War and History magazine), no. 26, January 2000, Communications Editions, Athens.
- Stecchini, Livio. "The Persian Wars".
- Roisman, Joseph; Worthington, Ian (2011). A Companion to Ancient Macedonia. John Wiley and Sons. ISBN 978-1-44-435163-7.
- Holland, Tom (2006). Persian Fire: The First World Empire and the Battle for the West. Doubleday. ISBN 0-385-51311-9.
