= Artaphernes (disambiguation) =

Artaphernes (Greek: Ἀρταφέρνης, Old Persian: Artafarna) was the name of several people from ancient Persia:

- Artaphernes, 5th century BCE Persian general and brother to Darius the Great
- Artaphernes (nephew of Darius I), 5th century BCE Persian general, son of Artaphernes and nephew to Darius the Great
- Artaphernes (emissary), 5th century BCE man of ancient Persia sent on a diplomatic mission to Sparta by Artaxerxes I
