= Siege of Sardis (498 BC) =

Event of the Ionian Revolt

- Part of Ionian Revolt
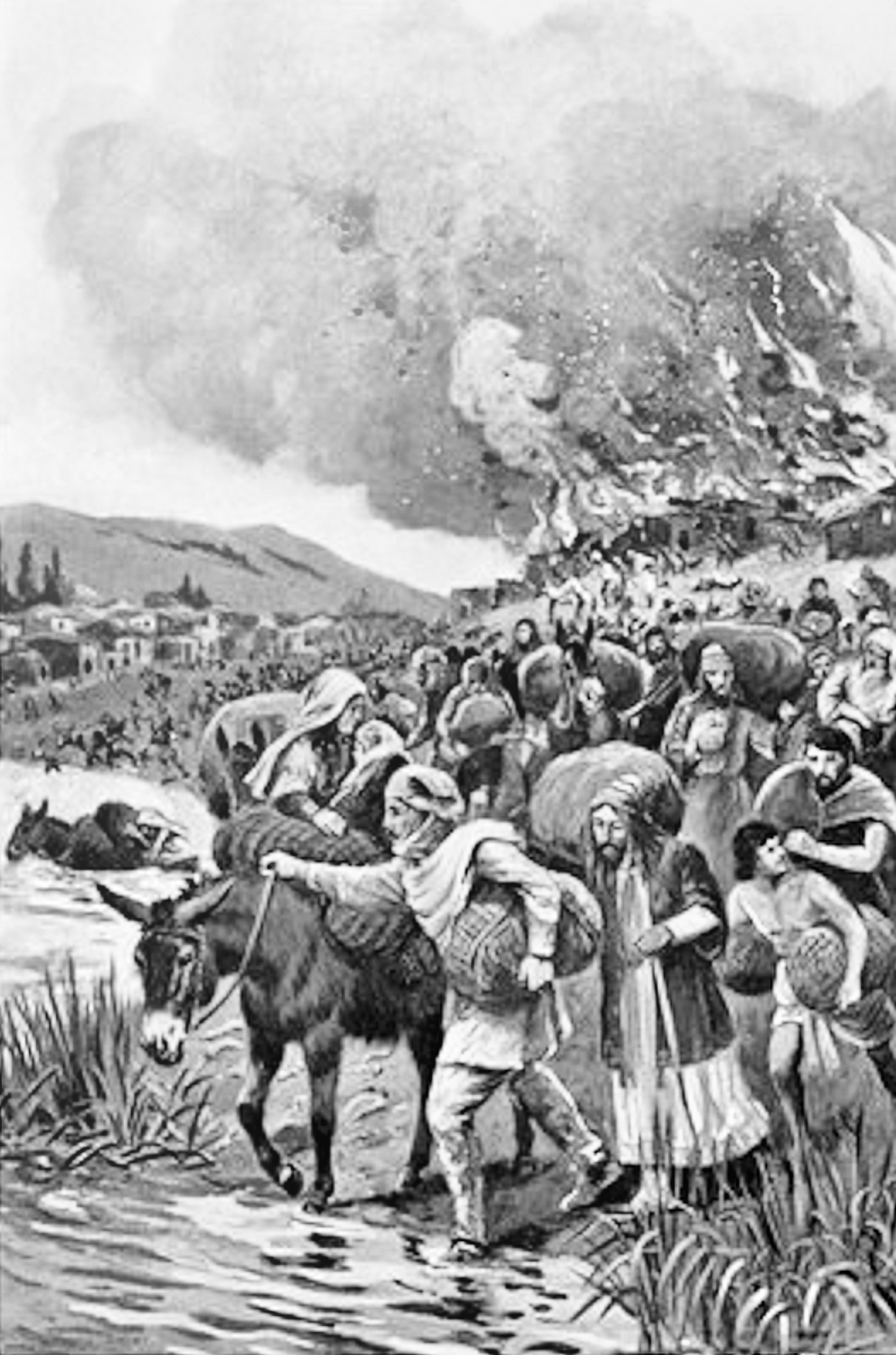
Date	498 BC
Location	Sardis (modern-day Sart, Manisa, Turkey)
Result	Greek retreat, city burned

Belligerents
Ionia; Athens; Eretria	Persian Empire

Commanders and leaders
Charopinus; Hermophantus	Artaphernes

Strength
Unknown	Unknown

Casualties and losses
Unknown	Unknown

The siege of Sardis was the first major engagement of the Ionian Revolt. An allied Greek army launched an attack on the Persian satrapal capital of Sardis but were ultimately repelled by Persian forces, however most of the city was set alight during the siege.

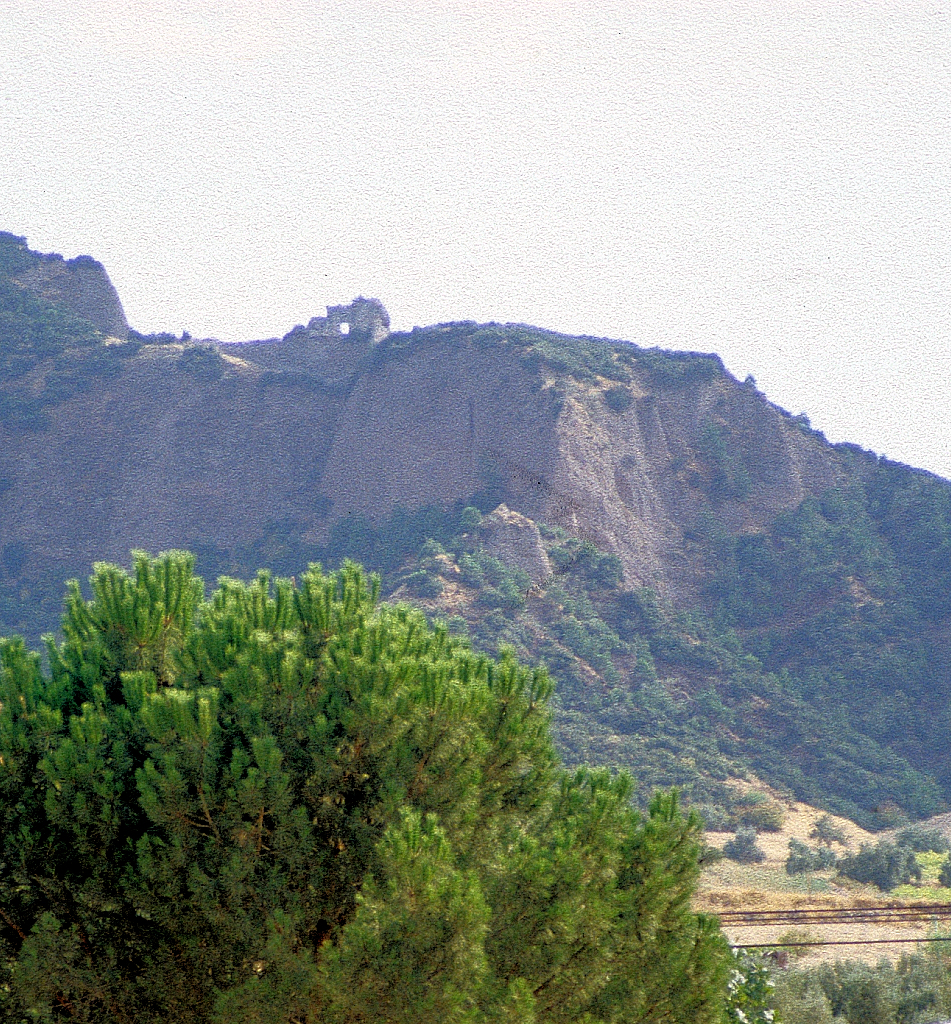
Remains of the acropolis of Sardis

== Background ==
The Ionian Revolt was triggered by the dissatisfaction of the Greek cities of Asia Minor with the tyrants appointed by Persia to rule them. In 499 BC, the then-tyrant of Miletus, Aristagoras, launched a joint expedition with the Persian satrap Artaphernes to conquer Naxos, in an attempt to bolster his position in Miletus. The mission was a debacle, and sensing his imminent removal as tyrant, Aristagoras chose to incite the whole of Ionia into rebellion against the Persian king Darius the Great. He also secured alliances with the mainland Greek cities of Athens and Eretria, convincing them the Persians would be easy to defeat.

== Battle ==
In the spring of 498 BC, an Athenian force of twenty triremes, accompanied by five from Eretria, set sail for Ionia. They joined up with the main Ionian force near Ephesus. Declining to personally lead the force, Aristagoras appointed his brother Charopinus and another Milesian, Hermophantus, as generals.

This force was then guided by the Ephesians through the mountains to Sardis, Artaphernes's satrapal capital. The Greeks caught the Persians unaware, and were able to capture the lower city. However, Artaphernes still held the citadel with a significant force of men. The lower city then caught on fire, Herodotus suggests accidentally, which quickly spread. The Persians in the citadel, being surrounded by a burning city, emerged into the market-place of Sardis, where they fought with the Greeks, forcing them back. The Greeks, demoralised, then retreated from the city, and began to make their way back to Ephesus.

Herodotus reports that when Darius heard of the burning of Sardis, he swore vengeance upon the Athenians (after asking who they were), and tasked a servant with reminding him three times each day of his vow: "Master, remember the Athenians".

== Aftermath ==
A Persian force pursued the Greeks back to Ephesus, defeating them in battle there. The Athenians now ended their alliance with the Ionians, since the Persians had proved to be anything but the easy prey that Aristagoras had described. However, the Ionians remained committed to their rebellion and the Persians did not seem to follow up their victory. Presumably these ad hoc forces were not equipped to lay siege to any of the cities. Despite the Greek defeat in the first campaign, the revolt actually spread further. The Ionians sent men to the Hellespont and Propontis and captured Byzantium and the other nearby cities. They also persuaded the Carians to join the rebellion. Furthermore, seeing the spread of the rebellion, the kingdoms of Cyprus also revolted against Persian rule without any outside persuasion.

== Bibliography ==
- Herodotus, The Histories (Godley translation, 1920)
- Holland, Tom (2006). Persian Fire: The First World Empire and the Battle for the West. Doubleday. ISBN 0-385-51311-9.
