= Siege of Naxos (499 BC) =

Attempt by Aristagoras to conquer Naxos

Coordinates: 37°5′N 25°28′E

- Part of the Ionian Revolt
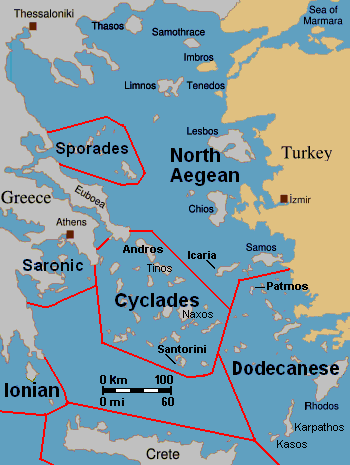
- Location of Naxos
Date	499 BC
Location	Naxos, Cyclades
Result	Naxiot victory; Ionian-Persian expeditionary force repelled after four-month siege

Belligerents
Naxos	Achaemenid Empire; Miletos

Commanders and leaders
Unknown	Megabates; Aristagoras

Strength
c. 8,000 hoplites	c. 8,000 marines 200 ships

The siege of Naxos (499 BC) was a failed attempt by the Milesian tyrant Aristagoras, operating with support from, and in the name of the Persian Empire of Darius the Great, to conquer the island of Naxos. It was the opening act of the Greco-Persian Wars, which would ultimately last for 50 years.

Aristagoras had been approached by exiled Naxian aristocrats, who were seeking to return to their island. Seeing an opportunity to bolster his position in Miletus, Aristagoras sought the help of his overlord, the Persian king Darius the Great, and the local satrap, Artaphernes to conquer Naxos. Consenting to the expedition, the Persians assembled a force of 200 triremes under the command of Megabates.

The expedition quickly descended into a debacle. Aristagoras and Megabates quarreled on the journey to Naxos, and someone (possibly Megabates) informed the Naxians of the imminent arrival of the force. When they arrived, the Persians and Ionians were thus faced with a city well prepared to undergo siege. The expeditionary force duly settled down to besiege the defenders, but after four months without success, ran out of money and were forced to return to Asia Minor.

In the aftermath of this disastrous expedition, and sensing his imminent removal as tyrant, Aristagoras chose to incite the whole of Ionia into rebellion against Darius the Great. The revolt then spread to Caria and Cyprus. Three years of Persian campaigning across Asia Minor followed, with no decisive effect, before the Persians regrouped and made straight for the epicentre of the rebellion at Miletus. At the Battle of Lade, the Persians decisively defeated the Ionian fleet and effectively ended the rebellion. Although Asia Minor had been brought back into the Persian fold, Darius vowed to punish Athens and Eretria, who had supported the revolt. In 492 BC therefore the first Persian invasion of Greece would begin as a consequence of the failed attack on Naxos, and the Ionian Revolt.

== Background ==
In the Greek Dark Ages that followed the collapse of the Mycenaean civilization, significant numbers of Greeks had emigrated to Asia Minor and settled there. These settlers were from three tribal groups: the Aeolians, Dorians and Ionians. The Ionians had settled about the coasts of Lydia and Caria, founding the twelve cities which made up Ionia. These cities were Miletus, Myus and Priene in Caria; Ephesus, Colophon, Lebedos, Teos, Clazomenae, Phocaea and Erythrae in Lydia; and the islands of Samos and Chios. The cities of Ionia had remained independent until they were conquered by the famous Lydian king Croesus, in around 560 BC. The Ionian cities then remained under Lydian rule until Lydia was in turn conquered by the nascent Achaemenid Empire of Cyrus the Great. The Persians found the Ionians difficult to rule. Elsewhere in the empire, Cyrus was able to identify elite native groups to help him rule his new subjects—such as the priesthood of Judea. No such group existed in Greek cities at this time; while there was usually an aristocracy, this was inevitably divided into feuding factions. The Persians thus settled for the sponsoring a tyrant in each Ionian city, even though this drew them into the Ionians' internal conflicts. Furthermore, a tyrant might develop an independent streak, and have to be replaced. The tyrants themselves faced a difficult task; they had to deflect the worst of their fellow citizens' hatred, while staying in the favour of the Persians.

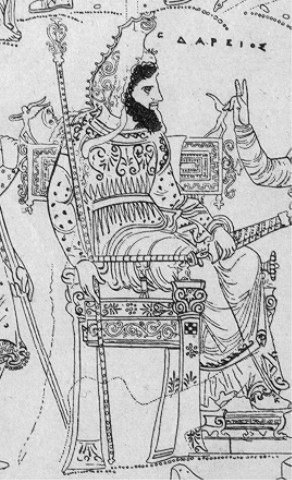
Darius I of Persia, as imagined by a Greek painter, 4th century BC

About 40 years after the Persian conquest of Ionia, and in the reign of the fourth Persian king, Darius the Great, the stand-in Milesian tyrant Aristagoras found himself in this familiar predicament. Aristagoras's uncle Histiaeus had accompanied Darius on campaign in 513 BC, and when offered a reward, had asked for part of the conquered Thracian territory. Although this was granted, Histiaeus's ambition alarmed Darius's advisors, and Histiaeus was thus further 'rewarded' by being compelled to remain in Susa as Darius's "Royal Table-Companion". Taking over from Histiaeus, Aristagoras was faced with bubbling discontent in Miletus.

Indeed, this period in Greek history is remarkable for the social and political upheaval in many Greek cities, particularly the establishment of the first democracy in Athens. The island of Naxos, part of the Cyclades group in the Aegean Sea, was also in this period affected by political turmoil. Naxos had been ruled by the tyrant Lygdamis, a protege of the Athenian tyrant Peisistratos, until around 524 BC, when he was overthrown by the Spartans. After this, a native aristocracy seems to have flourished, and Naxos became one of the most prosperous and powerful of the Aegean islands. Despite its success, Naxos was not immune to class tensions and internal strife, and shortly before 500 BC, the population seized power, expelling the aristocrats and establishing a democracy.

In 500 BC, Aristagoras was approached by some of the exiles from Naxos, who asked him to help restore them to the control of the island. Seeing an opportunity to strengthen his position in Miletus by conquering Naxos, Aristagoras approached the satrap of Lydia, Artaphernes, with a proposal. If Artaphernes provided an army, Aristagoras would conquer the island in Darius's name, and he would then give Artaphernes a share of the spoils to cover the cost of raising the army. Furthermore, Aristagoras suggested that once Naxos fell, the other Cyclades would also quickly follow, and he even suggested that Euboea could be attacked on the same expedition. Artaphernes agreed in principle, and asked Darius for permission to launch the expedition. Darius assented to this, and a force of 200 triremes was assembled in order to attack Naxos the following year.

== Prelude ==
The Persian fleet was duly assembled in the spring of 499 BC, and sailed to Ionia. Artaphernes put his (and Darius's) cousin Megabates in charge of the expedition, and dispatched him to Miletus with the Persian army. They were joined there by Aristagoras and the Milesian forces, and then embarked and set sail. In order to avoid warning the Naxians, the fleet initially sailed north, towards the Hellespont, but when they arrived at Chios they doubled back and headed south for Naxos.

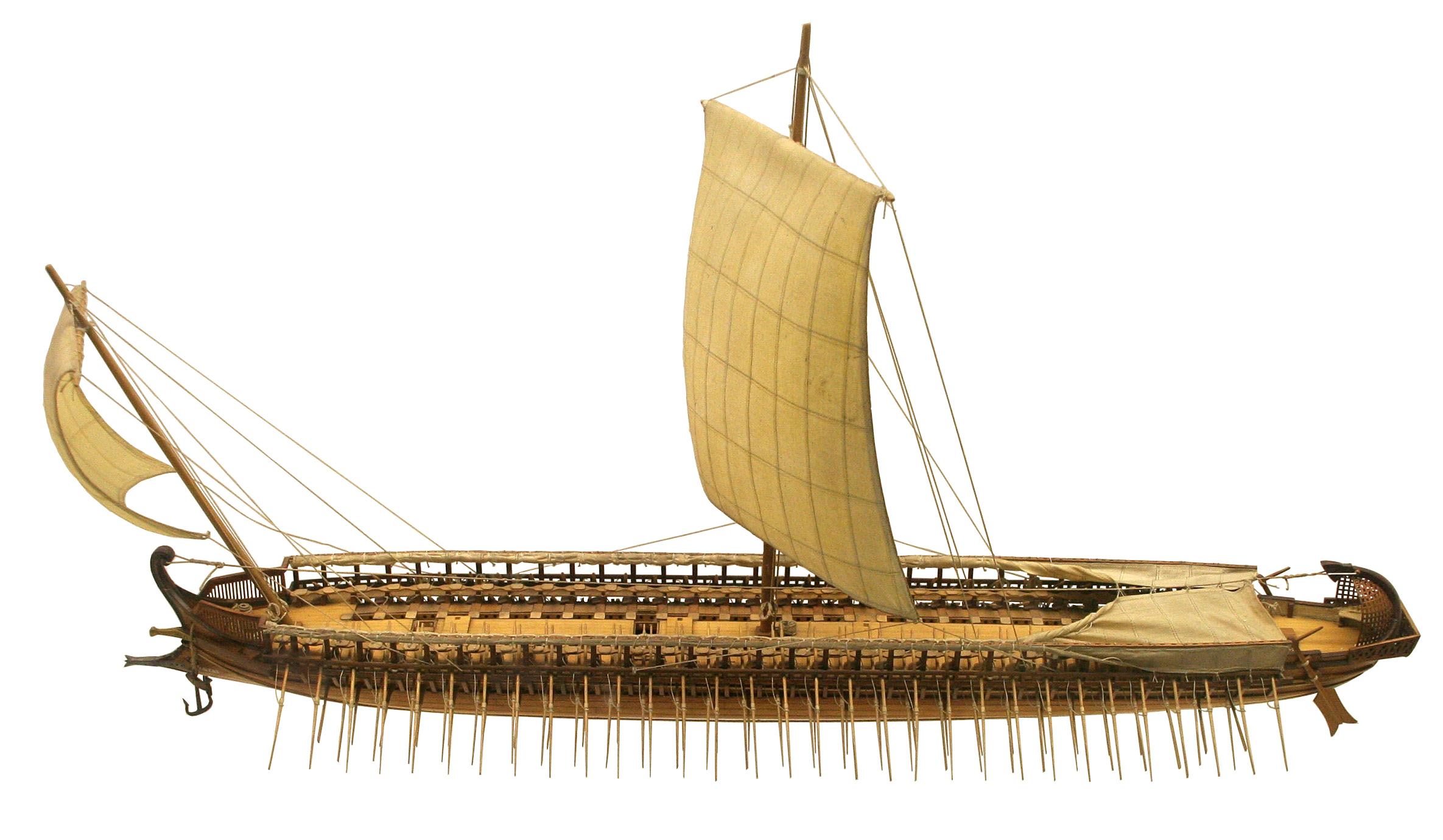
Reconstructed model of a trireme, the type of ship in use by both the Greek and Persian forces

Herodotus recounts that Megabates made inspections of the ships (probably whilst beached for the night), and came across one ship from Myndus which had not posted any sentries. Megabates ordered his guard to find the captain of the ship, Scylax, and then had the captain thrust into one of the ship's oar holes with his head outside and his body inside the ship. News reached Aristagoras of the treatment of his friend and he went to Megabates and asked him to reconsider his decision. When Megabates refused to grant Aristagoras's wishes, Aristagoras simply cut the captain loose himself. Predictably, Megabates was furious with Aristagoras, who in turn retorted "But you, what have you to do with these matters? Did not Artaphernes send you to obey me and to sail wherever I bid you? Why are you so meddlesome?". According to Herodotus, Megabates was so enraged by this that he sent messengers to the Naxians to warn them of the approach of the Persian force.

Modern historians, doubting that a Persian commander would have sabotaged his own invasion, have suggested several other possible scenarios. It is, however, impossible to know exactly how the Naxians became aware of the invasion, but undoubtedly they were aware, and began to make preparations. Herodotus tells us that the Naxians had previously had no inkling of the expedition, but that when news arrived they brought everything in from the fields, gathered enough food with which to survive a siege and reinforced their walls.

== Opposing forces ==
Herodotus does not provide complete numbers for either side, but gives some idea of the strength of the two forces. Clearly, since they were fighting on home territory, the Naxian forces could theoretically have included the whole population. Herodotus says in his narrative that the "Naxians have eight thousand men that bear shields", which suggests that there were 8,000 men capable of equipping themselves as hoplites. These men would have formed a strong backbone to the Naxian resistance.

The Persian force was primarily based around 200 triremes. It is not clear whether there were additional transport ships. The standard complement of a trireme was 200 men, including 14 marines. In the second Persian invasion of Greece, each Persian ship had carried thirty extra marines, and this was probably also true in the first invasion when the whole invasion force was apparently carried in triremes. Furthermore, the Chian ships at the Battle of Lade also carried 40 marines each. This suggests that a trireme could probably carry a maximum of 40–45 soldiers—triremes seem to have been easily destabilised by extra weight. If the Persian force at Naxos was similarly made up, then it would have contained somewhere in the region of 8,000 to 9,000 soldiers (in addition to many unarmed rowers).

== Siege ==
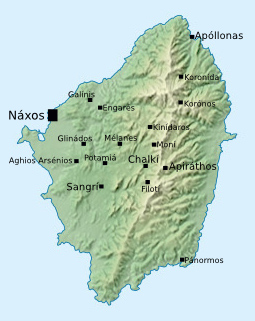
Map of Naxos, showing the eponymous main city

When the Ionians and Persians arrived at Naxos, they were faced by a well-fortified and supplied city. Herodotus does not explicitly say, but this was presumably the eponymous capital of Naxos. He provides few details of the military actions that ensued, although there is a suggestion that there was an initial assault on the city, which was repelled. The Ionians and Persians thus settled down to besiege the city. However, after four months, the Persians had run out of money, with Aristagoras also spending a great deal. Thoroughly demoralised, the expedition prepared to return to Asia Minor empty handed. Before leaving, they built a stronghold for the exiled Naxian aristocrats on the island. This was a typical strategy in the Greek world for those exiled by internal strife, giving them a base from which to quickly return, as events permitted.

== Aftermath ==
With the failure of his attempt to conquer Naxos, Aristagoras found himself in dire straits; he was unable to repay Artaphernes the costs of the expedition, and had moreover alienated himself from the Persian royal family. He fully expected to be stripped of his position by Artaphernes. In a desperate attempt to save himself, Aristagoras chose to incite his own subjects, the Milesians, to revolt against their Persian masters, thereby beginning the Ionian Revolt. Although Herodotus presents the revolt as a consequence of Aristagoras' personal motives, it is clear that Ionia must have been ripe for rebellion anyway, the primary grievance being the tyrants installed by the Persians. Aristagoras's actions have thus been likened to tossing a flame into a kindling box; they incited rebellion across Ionia (and Aeolis and Doris), and tyrannies were everywhere abolished, and democracies established in their place.

Having brought all of Hellenic Asia Minor into revolt, Aristagoras evidently realised that the Greeks would need other allies in order to fight the Persians. In the winter of 499 BC, he sailed to mainland Greece to try to recruit allies. He failed to persuade the Spartans, but the cities of Athens and Eretria agreed to support the rebellion. In the spring of 498 BC, an Athenian force of twenty triremes, accompanied by five from Eretria, for a total of twenty-five triremes, set sail for Ionia. They joined up with the main Ionian force near Ephesus. This force was then guided by the Ephesians through mountains to Sardis, Artaphernes's satrapal capital. The Greeks caught the Persians unawares, and were able to capture the lower city. However, the lower city then caught on fire, and the Greeks, demoralised, then retreated from the city, and began to make their way back to Ephesus. The Persian troops in Asia Minor followed the Greek force, catching them outside Ephesus. It is clear that the demoralised and tired Greeks were no match for the Persians, and were completely routed in the battle which ensued at Ephesus. The Ionians who escaped the battle made for their own cities, while the remaining Athenians and Eretrians managed to return to their ships, and sailed back to Greece.

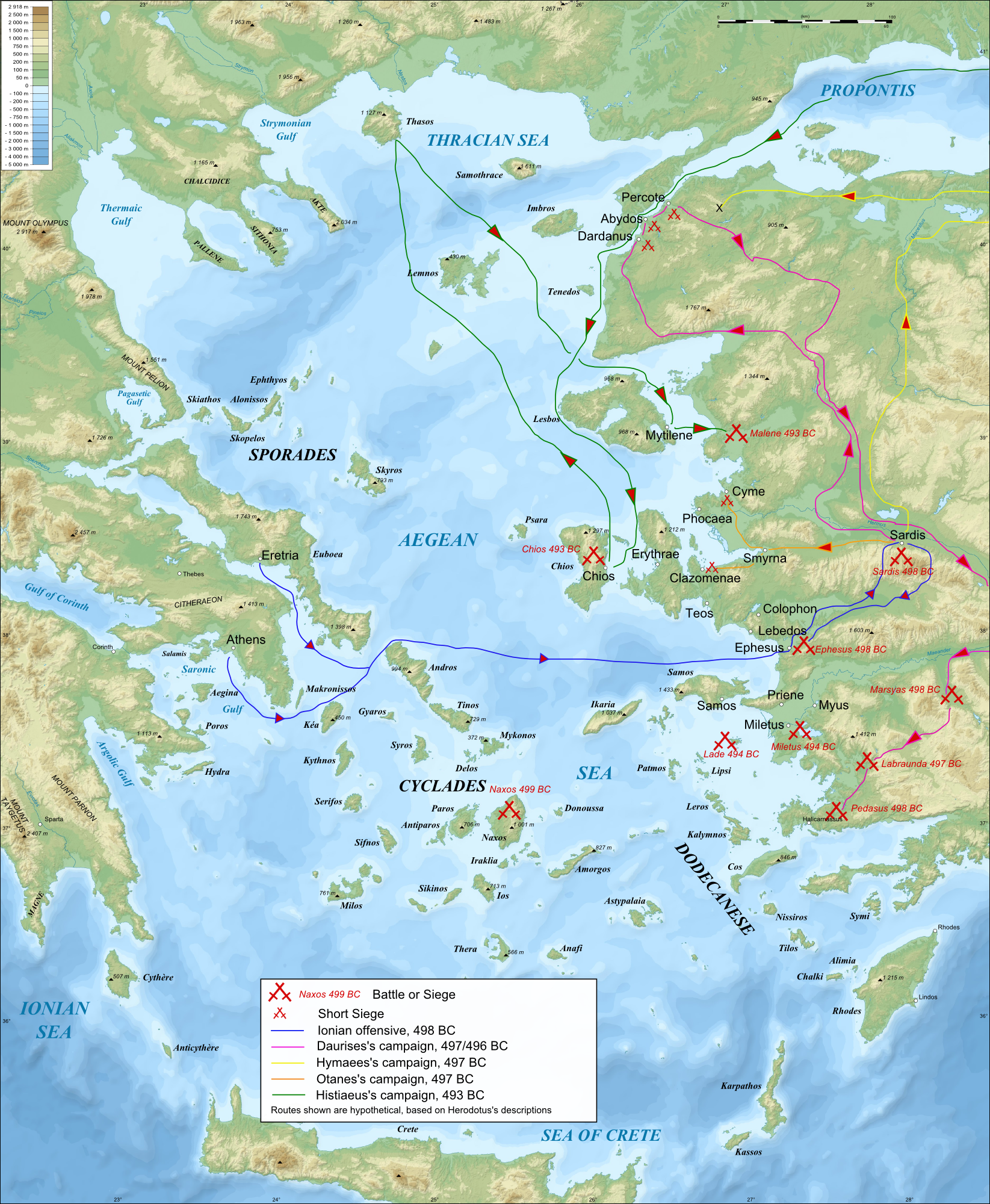
Main events of the Ionian Revolt

Despite these setbacks, the revolt spread further. The Ionians sent men to the Hellespont and Propontis, and captured Byzantium and the other nearby cities. They also persuaded the Carians to join the rebellion. Furthermore, seeing the spread of the rebellion, the kingdoms of Cyprus also revolted against Persian rule without any outside persuasion. For the next three years, the Persian army and navy were fully occupied with fighting the rebellions in Caria and Cyprus, and Ionia seems to have had an uneasy peace during these years. At the height of the Persian counter-offensive, Aristagoras, sensing the untenability of his position, decided to abandon his position as leader of Miletus, and of the revolt, and he left Miletus. Herodotus, who evidently has a rather negative view of him, suggests that Aristagoras simply lost his nerve and fled.

By the sixth year of the revolt (494 BC), the Persian forces had regrouped. The available land forces were gathered into one army, and were accompanied by a fleet supplied by the re-subjugated Cypriots, and the Egyptians, Cilicians and Phoenicians. The Persians headed directly to Miletus, paying little attention to other strongholds, presumably intending to tackle the revolt at its centre. The Ionians sought to defend Miletus by sea, leaving the defense of Miletus to the Milesians. The Ionian fleet gathered at the island of Lade, off the coast of Miletus. The Persians were uncertain of victory at Lade, so attempted to persuade some of the Ionian contingents to defect. Although this was unsuccessful at first, when the Persians finally attacked the Ionians, the Samian contingent accepted the Persian offer. As the Persian and Ionian fleets met, the Samians sailed away from the battle, causing the collapse of the Ionian battle line. Although the Chian contingent and a few other ships remained, and fought bravely against the Persians, the battle was lost.

With defeat at Lade, the Ionian Revolt was all but ended. The next year, the Persians reduced the last rebel strongholds, and began the process of bringing peace to the region. The Ionian Revolt constituted the first major conflict between Greece and the Persian Empire, and as such represents the first phase of the Greco-Persian Wars. Although Asia Minor had been brought back into the Persian fold, Darius vowed to punish Athens and Eretria for their support for the revolt. Moreover, seeing that the myriad city states of Greece posed a continued threat to the stability of his empire, he decided to conquer the whole of Greece. In 492 BC, the first Persian invasion of Greece, the next phase of the Greco-Persian Wars, would begin as a direct consequence of the Ionian Revolt.

== Bibliography ==
=== Ancient sources ===
- Herodotus, The Histories (Godley translation, 1920)
- Thucydides, History of The Peloponnesian Wars
- Diodorus Siculus, Library
- Cicero, On the Laws

=== Modern Sources ===
- Boardman J, Bury JB, Cook SA, Adcock FA, Hammond NGL, Charlesworth MP, Lewis DM, Baynes NH, Ostwald M, Seltman CT (1988). The Cambridge Ancient History, vol. 5. Cambridge University Press. ISBN 0-521-22804-2.
- Fehling, D. (1989). Herodotus and His "Sources": Citation, Invention, and Narrative Art (Translated by J.G. Howie). Francis Cairns.
- Fine, JVA (1983). The Ancient Greeks: A Critical History. Harvard University Press. ISBN 0-674-03314-0.
- Finley, Moses (1972). "Introduction". Thucydides – History of the Peloponnesian War. Translated by Rex Warner. Penguin. ISBN 0-14-044039-9.
- Goldsworthy, A. (2003). The Fall of Carthage. Cassel. ISBN 0-304-36642-0.
- Holland, Tom (2006). Persian Fire: The First World Empire and the Battle for the West. Doubleday. ISBN 0-385-51311-9.
- Keaveney, A. (1988). The Attack on Naxos: A 'Forgotten Cause' of the Ionian Revolt.
- Lazenby, JF (1993). The Defence of Greece 490–479 BC. Aris & Phillips Ltd. ISBN 0-85668-591-7.
- Lloyd, A. (2004). Marathon: The Crucial Battle That Created Western Democracy. Souvenir Press. ISBN 0-285-63688-X.
