= Siege of Sardis =

Siege of Sardis may refer to:

- Siege of Sardis (547 BC), the last decisive conflict after the Battle of Thymbra, which was fought between the forces of Croesus of Lydia and Cyrus the Great
- Siege of Sardis (498 BC) between the people of Sardis and an alliance of Greeks from Ionia, Athens, and Eretria
- Siege of Sardis (213 BC), fought between usurper Achaeus and the Seleucid Empire
