= Hecataeus of Miletus =

Greek historian and geographer (c. 550–c. 476 BC)

- Born: c. 550 BC; Miletus (now Balat, Aydın, Turkey)
- Died: c. 476 BC (aged 74)
- Scientific career
- Fields: History and geography

Hecataeus of Miletus (/ˌhɛkəˈtiːəs/; Greek: Ἑκαταῖος ὁ Μιλήσιος; c. 550 – c. 476 BC), son of Hegesander, was an early Greek historian and geographer.

== Biography ==
Hailing from a very wealthy family, he lived in Miletus, then under Persian rule in the satrapy of Lydia. He was active during the time of the Greco-Persian Wars. After having travelled extensively, he settled in his native city, where he occupied a high position, and devoted his time to the composition of geographical and historical works. When Aristagoras, acting tyrant of Miletus, held a council of leading Ionians at Miletus to organize a revolt against Persian rule, Hecataeus tried in vain to dissuade his countrymen from the undertaking. In 494 BC, when the defeated Ionians were obliged to sue for terms, he was one of the ambassadors to the Persian satrap Artaphernes, whom he persuaded to restore the constitution of the Ionic cities. Hecataeus is the first known Greek historian and was one of the first classical writers to mention the Celtic and Illyrian peoples. He is known as the "Father of Geography".

== Works ==
Two works by Hecateus are known: Περίοδος γῆς (Periodos ges, "Journey round the Earth" or "World Survey") and Γενεαλογίαι (Genealogiai) or the Ἱστορία (Historia). However, they only survive in fragments.

=== Periodos ges ===
Periodos ges was written in two books, the first on Europe, the second on Asia, in which he included Africa. The book is a comprehensive work on geography beginning at the Straits of Gibraltar and going clockwise ending at the Atlantic coast of Morocco following the coast of the Mediterranean and Black Sea. Hecataeaus provides information about the people and places that would be encountered on a coastal voyage between these points, as well as the inhabitants of the various Mediterranean islands, the Scythians, Persia, India, Egypt and Nubia. Over 300 fragments of this work are preserved, mostly as citations for place names in the work of Stephanus of Byzantium.

=== Genealogies ===
Hecataeus's other work was a book on mythography in four books. Less than forty fragments remain. He applied a more skeptical approach to the traditions of families who claimed to be descended from gods.

One fragment that has survived is the opening "Hecataeus of Miletus thus speaks: I write what I deem true; for the stories of the Greeks are manifold and seem to me ridiculous."

Herodotus (II, 143) tells a story of a visit by Hecataeus to an Egyptian temple at Thebes. It recounts how the priests showed Hecataeus a series of statues in the temple's inner sanctum, each one supposedly set up by the high priest of each generation. Hecataeus, says Herodotus, had seen the same spectacle, after mentioning that he traced his descent, through sixteen generations, from a god. The Egyptians compared his genealogy to their own, as recorded by the statues; since the generations of their high priests had numbered three hundred and forty-five, all mortal men, they refused to believe Hecataeus's claim of descent from a god. Historian James Shotwell has called this encounter with the antiquity of Egypt an influence on Hecataeus's scepticism: he recognized that oral history is untrustworthy.

=== Map ===
recreation World map of Hecataeus

Besides his written works, Hecataeus is also credited with improving the map of Anaximander, which he saw as a disc encircled by Oceanus.

== Summary ==
He was probably the first of the logographers to attempt a serious prose history and to employ critical method to distinguish myth from historical fact, though he accepts Homer and other poets as trustworthy authorities. Herodotus, though he contradicts his statements at least once, is indebted to Hecataeus for the concept of a prose history.

== Sources ==
- Hecataei Milesii Fragmenta: Scylacis Caryandensis Periplus 1831 edition of Hecateus fragments from Google Books
- Shotwell, James T. (1922). The History of History. NY: Columbia University Press.

Attribution
