= Megabates =

Late 6th/early 5th century BC Persian general

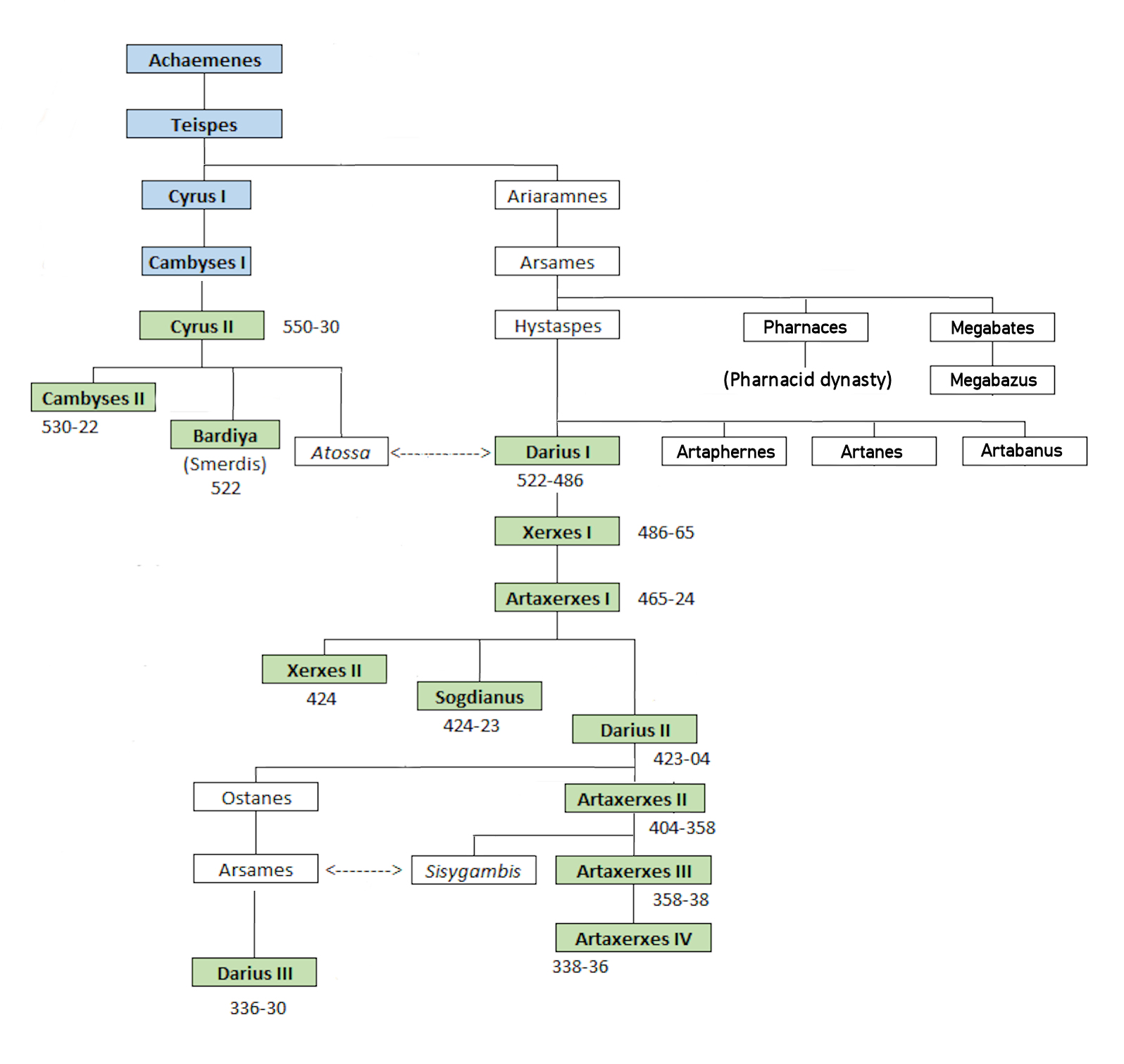
Megabates was son of Arsames, and brother of Hystaspes.

Megabates (Old Persian: *Bagapātaʰ; Ancient Greek: Μεγαβάτης Megabátēs; dates unknown) was a Persian military leader in the late 6th and early 5th centuries BC. According to Herodotus he was a cousin of Darius the Great and his brother Artaphernes, satrap of Lydia.

Based on the writings of Herodotus, Megabates is most notable for his joint participation in the failed 499 BC siege of Naxos. With Aristagoras and 200 ships, he was sent by Darius the Great to annex the small Aegean island to the Persian Empire.

Herodotus is of the view that this venture failed after a siege of four months because of the mutual dislike between Aristagoras and Megabates. As a result, Herodotus states that it was Megabates who forewarned the Naxians of the ensuing Persian siege, as he and Aristagoras argued after Megabates punished a captain for not setting up a watch. As a result, the people of Naxos gathered supplies and fortified their city to withstand a four-month-long siege.

Megabates followed in his older brother's footsteps and was appointed satrap of Phrygia, with his residence at Dascylium.

One of his sons was Megabazus.

== See also ==
- Megabyzus
- Megabazus
