= Myrcinus =

Coordinates: 40°54′05″N 23°49′11″E

Myrcinus or Myrkinos (Ancient Greek: Μύρκινος or Μύρκιννος) was an ancient Greek city located in Macedonian Thrace, in the region of Edonis between the Strymon and the Nestos Rivers, on the left bank of the Strymon. It was within the territory of the Edonians, a Thracian tribe, and was founded as a polis by colonists from Miletus in 497 BCE. The colonists were led by Histiaios (already a Tyrant of Miletus), whom Darius had allowed to build a city in reward for his help. Its site offered great advantages to settlers, as it contained an abundant supply of timber for shipbuilding, as well as silver mines. Aristagoras retired to this place, and, soon after landing, perished before some Thracian town which he was besieging. Afterwards, it had fallen into the hands of the Edoni; but on the murder of Pittacus, chief of that people, it surrendered to Brasidas after he captured Amphipolis, Oesyme and Galepsus in 422 BCE. During the Byzantine Empire it was known as Doxompos (Δοξόμπος) or Doxompus (Δοξόμπους).

Its site is near the modern village renamed Myrkinos in honour of the ancient town.

== See also ==
- Greek colonies in Thrace
