= Artaphernes =

Persian general and satrap, 513 to 492 BC

- Artafarna
- Children: Artaphernes II
- Relatives: Darius the Great (brother)
- Military career
- Allegiance: Achaemenid Empire
- Service years: 513–492 BC
- Rank: Satrap of Lydia
- Conflicts: Ionian revolt

Artaphernes (Greek: Ἀρταφέρνης, Old Persian: Artafarna, from Median Rtafarnah) was a brother of the Achaemenid king Darius I and held power circa 513–492 BC. He was appointed satrap of Lydia, which he governed from its capital of Sardis. As satrap of Lydia he had to deal with the Greeks, and played an important role in both the Siege of Naxos and in suppressing the Ionian Revolt.

== Etymology ==
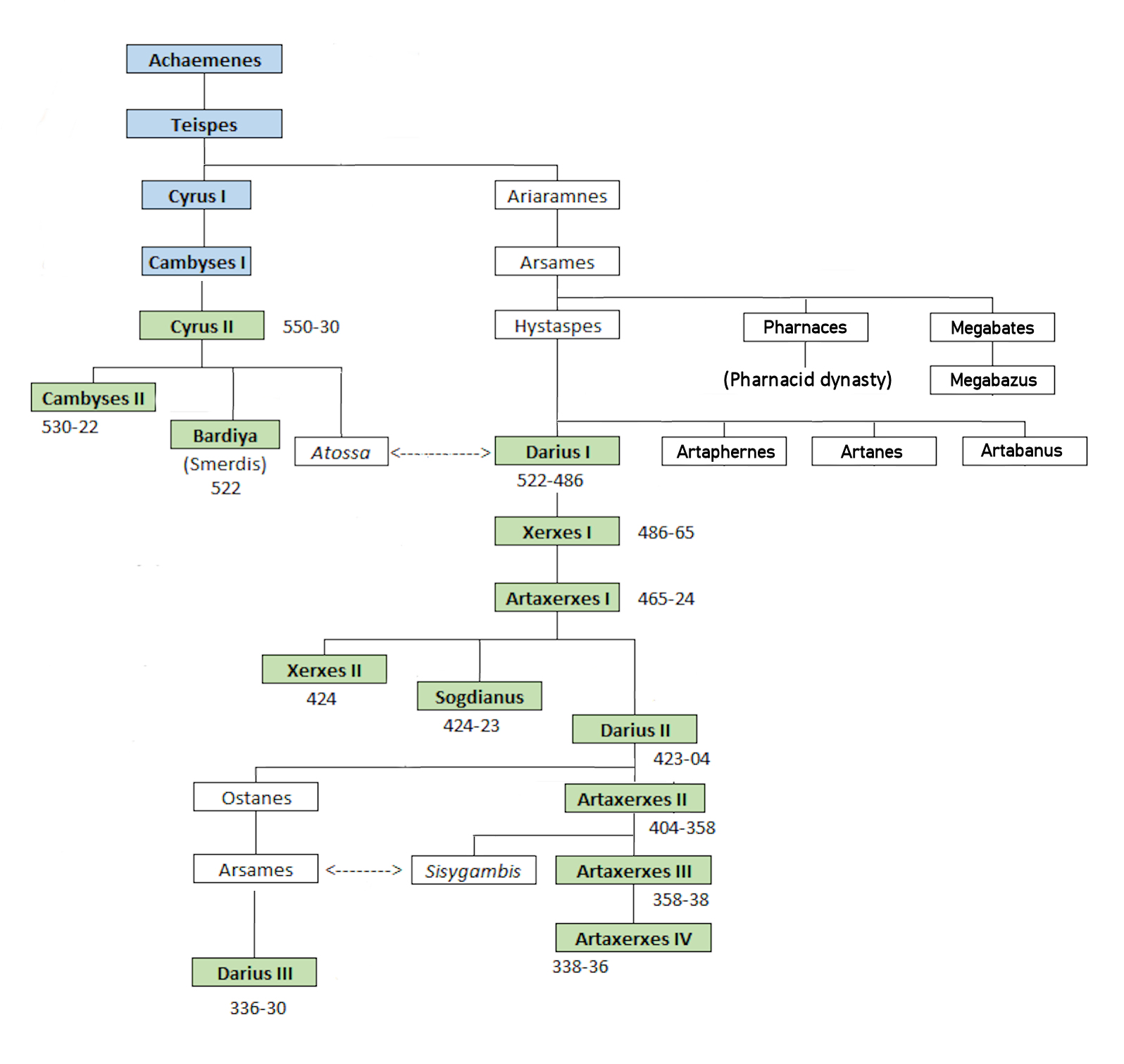
Achaemenid lineage: Artaphernes was son of Hystaspes, and brother of Darius I.

Artaphernes is the Greek adaptation of *Artafarnah- (endowed with the Glory of the Right). Arta is a common prefix for Achaemenid names and means justice. Farnah means "splendour, glory."

== Biography ==
=== Background to Satrapy ===
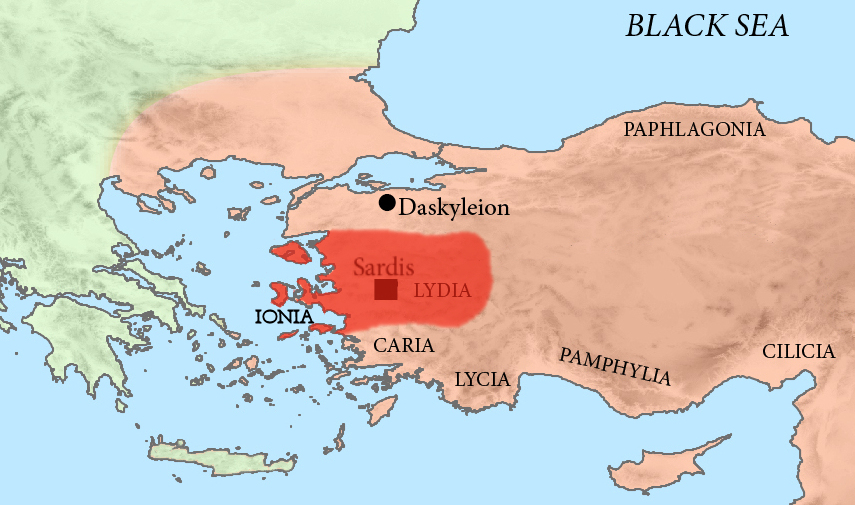
The Satrapy of Lydia at the time Artaphernes came to power in 513 BC.

Artaphernes was the son of Hystaspes and brother of Darius I. When Darius took power, he organized his empire into twenty districts called satrapies, regularized tributes that subjects owed, and appointed satraps. Before Artaphernes took power in Asia Minor the previous satrap, Oroetes assassinated Mitrobates, another satrap at Dascylium, and his son Cranaspes in 522 BC. Bagaeus, who may have become satrap afterwards, was appointed to kill Oreotes. Darius appointed Artaphernes to be the next satrap in 513 BC.

=== First contacts with Athens (507 BC) ===
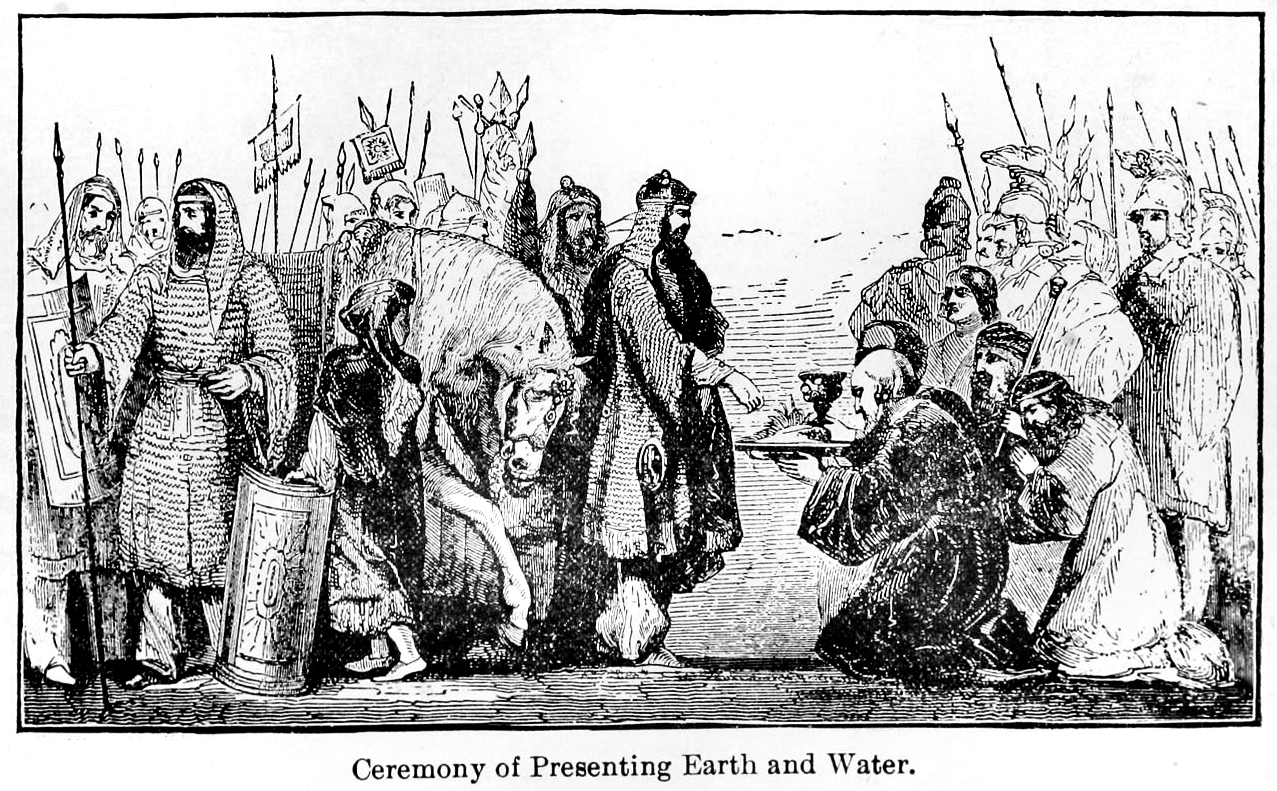
The Ceremony of Presenting Earth and Water. In 507 BC, Athenians were pressured into giving Artaphernes Earth and Water in exchange for a Persian alliance.

In 507 BC, Artaphernes, as brother of Darius I and Satrap of Asia Minor in his capital Sardis, received an embassy from Athens, probably sent by Cleisthenes, who was looking for Persian assistance to resist the threats from Sparta. When the envoys arrived Artaphernes asked them "What men are you and where do you live, who desire alliance with the Persians?" After he had been informed about who the Athenians were he asked the envoys for "Earth and Water", a symbol of submission, if they wanted help from the Achaemenid king, but if not they had to leave. The ambassadors agreed to give "Earth and Water". However, when the envoys returned to Athens they were censured.

=== Hippias and Artaphernes ===
Hippias, the former tyrant of Athens expelled in 510 BC, went to the Persians for assistance in regaining control of Athens in 505 BC. Hippias maligned the Athenians to Artaphernes and did all that he could in an attempt to bring Athens under control of the Persians. One of the main reasons why Artaphernes may have been willing to take up the cause for Hippias was because of the Athenians denial of the alliance with Persia in 507 BC. In the Persian point of view the submission to Darius I was permanent which meant that Artaphernes would have been inclined to support whichever Athenian government that supported the alliance. However, the Athenians heard about the attempts by Hippias to regain his power and sent messengers to Sardis, warning the Persians not to believe banished Athenians. Artaphernes, told the Athenians to allow Hippias to return to Athens "if they wanted to be safe." When the threat was brought back to the Athenians, they refused, and instead decided that they were at war with Persia.

=== Siege of Naxos ===
In 525 BC an oligarchy began to rule Naxos but by 503 BC the oligarchs were expelled by the democratic party and a constitution was created. The Siege of Naxos (499 BC) occurred because the expelled oligarchs then went to Miletus and asked if Aristagoras, the acting tyrant of Miletus, was able to give them enough force to regain their country. Aristagoras listened to this appeal and told them that he would have to go to Artaphernes for naval support. Artaphernes agreed to assist because it would be profitable for the king and because he saw an opportunity for the expansion of Persian influence into the Cyclade Islands. However, Darius I needed to agree to the plan but once he did two hundred triremes were supplied and Megabates was appointed as general of the army.

After a fight started between Megabates and Aristagoras, Megabates sent a message to Naxos informing them of the expedition and what the goal was. This message allowed Naxos to prepare for a long siege but the Persians did not have enough provisions or money to maintain this sort of operation. The siege continued for four months, until the Persians spent everything that they had come with and Aristagoras own money, the Persians were forced to withdraw. The failure of the siege of Naxos led to the Ionian Revolt because Aristagoras feared what would happen to him as a result of the failure.

=== Ionian revolt (499-494 BC) ===
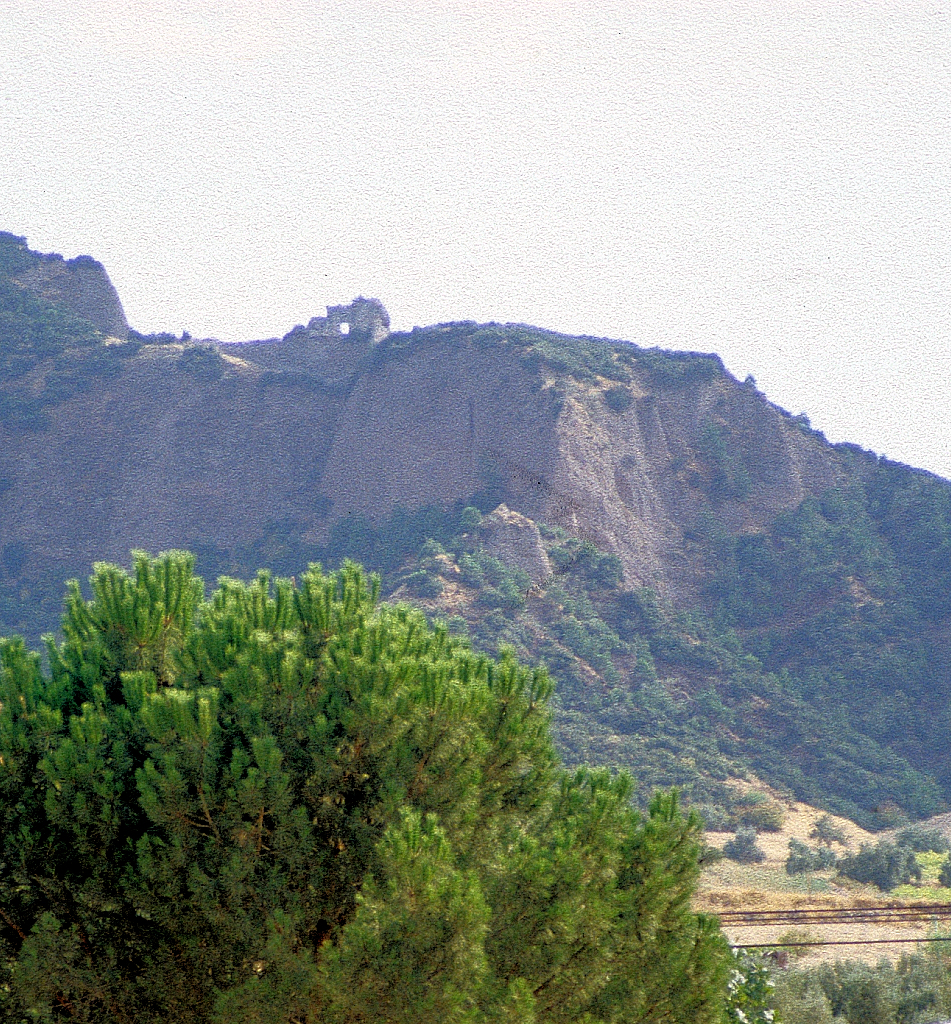
Artaphernes successfully resisted the Greek and Ionian siege in the citadel of Sardis.

Soon after this, the Ionian Revolt began, at the instigation of Aristagoras who felt certain that the failure of the Siege of Naxos would lead to his lordship being taken away from him or his life. Histiaeus, who was the tyrant of Miletus but was recalled to Susa after Darius grew fearful of Ionia's power believed that he would be sent back to the coast if there was a revolt so he gave his support. After Histiaeus sent Aristagoras a secret message, in which he signified that Aristagoras should revolt the Ionian Revolt began. Subsequently, Artaphernes played an important role in suppressing the Ionian Revolt.

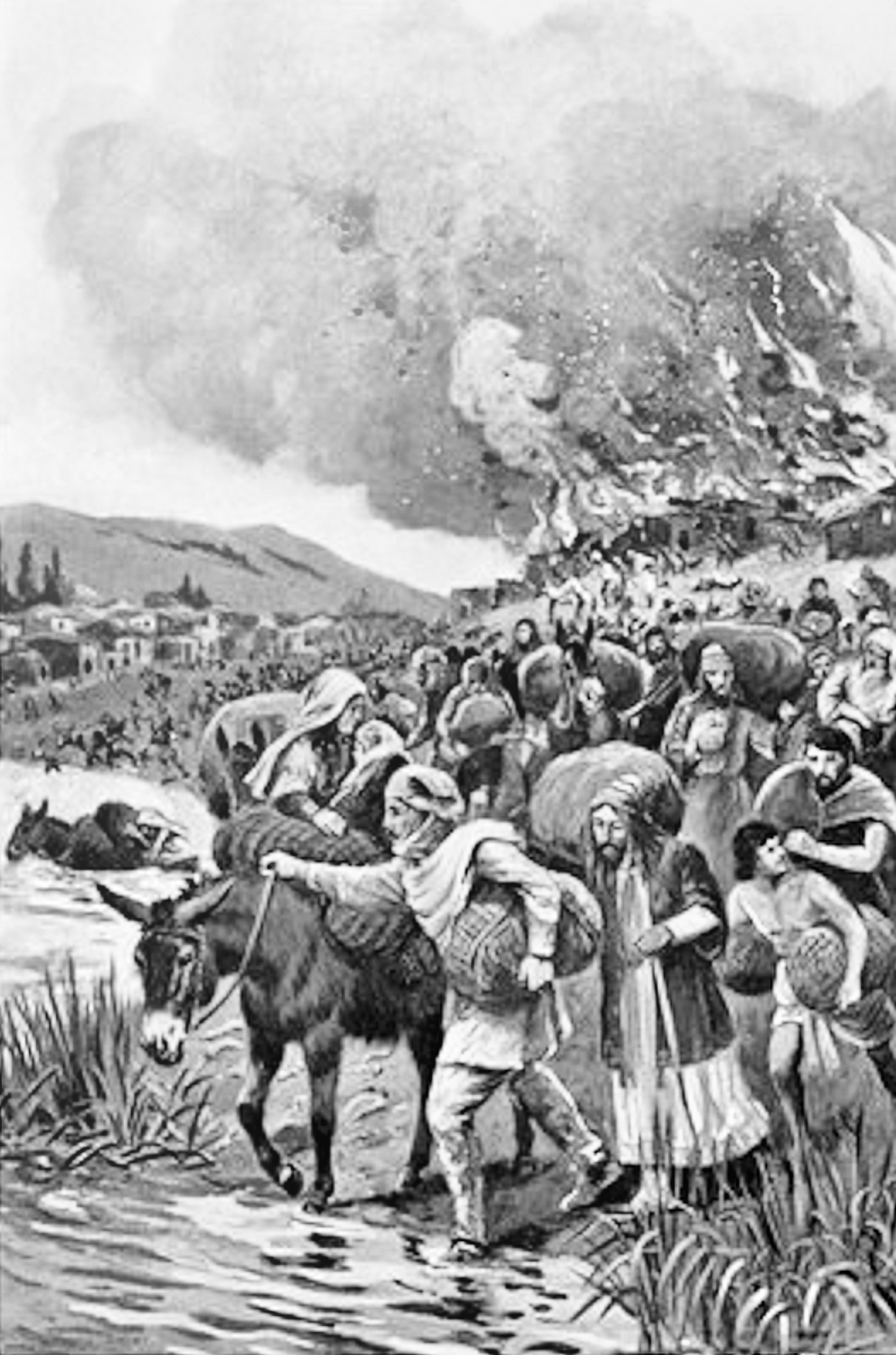
After the Siege of Sardis (498 BC), the Greeks set fires that burned Sardis to the ground.

Aristagoras then attempted to convince other Ionian cities to revolt and visited the Greek mainland in an attempt to find allies. He was successful in convincing Athens and Eretria to provide ships and men. Athenian and Eretrian ships transported the Athenian troops to the Ionian city of Ephesus. There they were joined by a force of Ionians and they marched upon Sardis, leading to the Siege of Sardis (498 BC). Sardis was taken easily but the army was not able to take the citadel which was being held by Artaphernes and an army of men. Although the Greeks were unable to take the citadel, they pillaged the town and set fires that burnt Sardis to the ground. When the military saw that the Persians were defending themselves they withdrew to Ephesus where they were defeated. The Athenians then ended their alliance with Ionia and refused to send more aid. The revolt continued to spread into Byzantium, Caria, Camus, and Cyprus.

Artaphernes and Otanes were put in charge of retaking Ionia and Anatolian territory and they retook Clazomenae and Clyme. Having successfully captured several of the revolting Greek city-states, the Persians under Artaphernes laid siege to Miletus. The decisive Battle of Lade was fought in 494 BC close to the island of Lade, near Miletus' port. Although out-numbered, the Greek fleet appeared to be winning the battle until the ships from Samos and Lesbos retreated. The sudden defection turned the tide of battle, and the remaining Greek fleet was completely destroyed. Miletus surrendered shortly thereafter and the Ionian Revolt effectively came to an end.

==== Execution of Histiaeus ====
Histiaeus, who had been an instigator of the Ionian revolt, was released from his captivity in Susa and sent down to Sardis after he persuaded Darius to allow him to help quiet the outbreak. When Histiaeus arrived in Sardis, Artaphernes asked him why he thought that the Ionians had rebelled and Histiaeus replied that he did not know. But Artaphernes knew what the true story was and said, "I will tell you, Histiaeus, the truth of this business: it was you who stitched this shoe, and Aristagoras who put it on." This frightened Histiaeus who then fled to Chios and made his way back to Miletus but the Miletans did not wish to have him so he had to return to Chios. He then went to Lesbos and persuaded the leaders to give him eight triremes and sailed to Byzantium which was where he established himself.

When he fled to Chios, Histiaeus sent letters to Persians in Sardis because they had previously spoken to him about the revolt. The messenger, however, delivered these letters to Artaphernes who allowed the messenger to give the letters to the recipients but to bring back the replies. When the men were discovered, Artaphernes put those men to death.

After Histiaeus heard the news about Miletus falling he sailed to Chios and forced his way in. Histiaeus then amassed a large force of Ionians and Anatolians against Thasos but when he heard that the Persians were being sent out to attack the rest of Ionia, he fled to Lesbos. His army was hungry so he had to lead foraging expeditions into different islands which was when he was captured by the Persian general, Harpagus in 493 BC. He was then brought back to Artaphernes who did not want to send him back to Susa, where he suspected that Darius would pardon him, so he executed him by impaling him, and sent his head to Darius. Darius still did not believe Histiaeus was a traitor and gave his head an honorable burial.

==== After the Revolt ====
Hecataeus was dispatched as ambassador for the Ionians and asked Artaphernes why he had no faith in them. Artaphernes replied that he worried that the Ionians held resentment after their defeat and Hecateus said, "Well then, if suffering ill treatment has the effect of creating bad faith, receiving kind treatment will surely cause our cities to be well disposed towards the Persians." Even though this story may have been pure invention it still shows the ways that Persians regard themselves.

Artaphernes then forced the Ionian cities to create agreements among themselves that they would listen to the law and not rob one another. He also reorganized the land register by measured out their territories in parasangs and assessed their tributes accordingly. With these reforms it minimized the amount of arguing between the cities and established a lasting stability. These new reforms also set a standard where Persians arbitrated between differences in Ionia. After establishing these changes Artaphernes disappears from the historical record. In 492 BC Mardonius took over Artaphernes's satrapy and reversed the decision to restore tyrants to power and turned local rule over to democracies. In 490 his son of the same name with Datis, took command of the expedition sent by Darius to punish Athens and Eretria for their role in the Ionian Revolt.

== Sources ==
- Pierre Briant, From Cyrus to Alexander: A History of the Persian Empire (Eisenbrauns, 2002)
