= Artaphernes (emissary) =

Ancient Persian diplomat sent to Sparta in an anecdote of Thucydides

Artaphernes (Ancient Greek: Ἀρταφέρνης) was a man of ancient Persia who lived in the 5th century BCE who was sent by king Artaxerxes I in 425 BCE with a letter to Sparta.

While he passed through Eion on the Strymon River, he was arrested by Aristeides, the son of Archippus, and carried to Athens, where the letter of his king was opened and translated. It contained a complaint of the king, that owing to the many and discrepant messages the Spartans had sent to him, he did not know what they wanted; and he therefore requested them to send a fresh embassy back with Artaphernes, and to explain clearly what were Sparta's actual requests.

The Athenians thought this a favorable opportunity for forming connections themselves with Persia, and accordingly sent Artaphernes back in a galley, accompanied by Athenian ambassadors, to Ephesus. On their arrival there they received news of the death of king Artaxerxes, and the Athenians returned home.
