= Histiaeus =

Greek ruler of Miletus (died 493 BC)

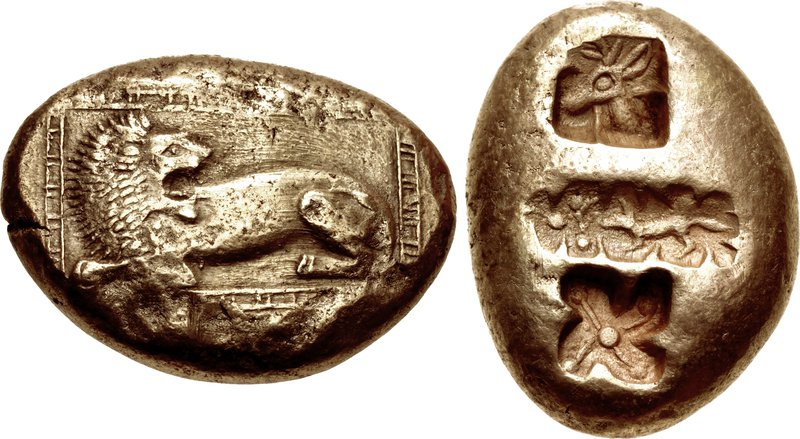
Electrum coinage of Miletus, around the birth of Histiaeus. Circa 600-550 BC.

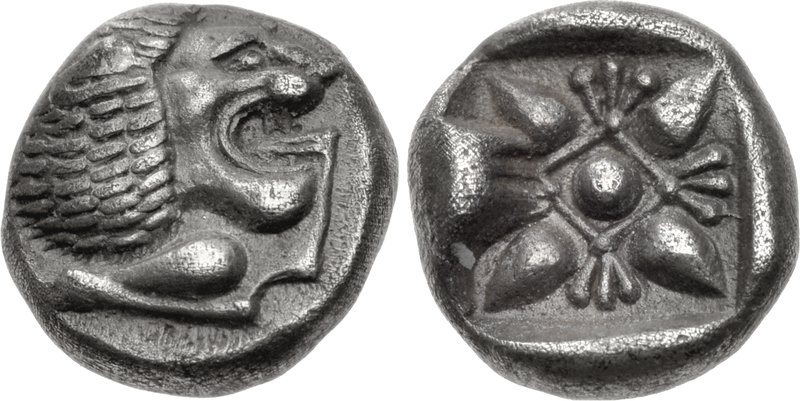
Coinage of Miletus at the time of Histiaeus. AR Obol (9mm, 1.07 g). Forepart of lion left, head right. Stellate and floral design within incuse square. Late 6th-early 5th century BC.

Histiaeus (Ancient Greek: Ἱστιαῖος, died 493 BC), the son of Lysagoras, was a Greek ruler of Miletus in the late 6th century BC. Histiaeus was tyrant of Miletus under Darius I, king of Persia, who had subjugated Miletus and the other Ionian states in Asia Minor, and who generally appointed Greeks as tyrants to rule the Greek cities of Ionia in his territory.

== Scythian campaign of Darius I (circa 513 BC) ==
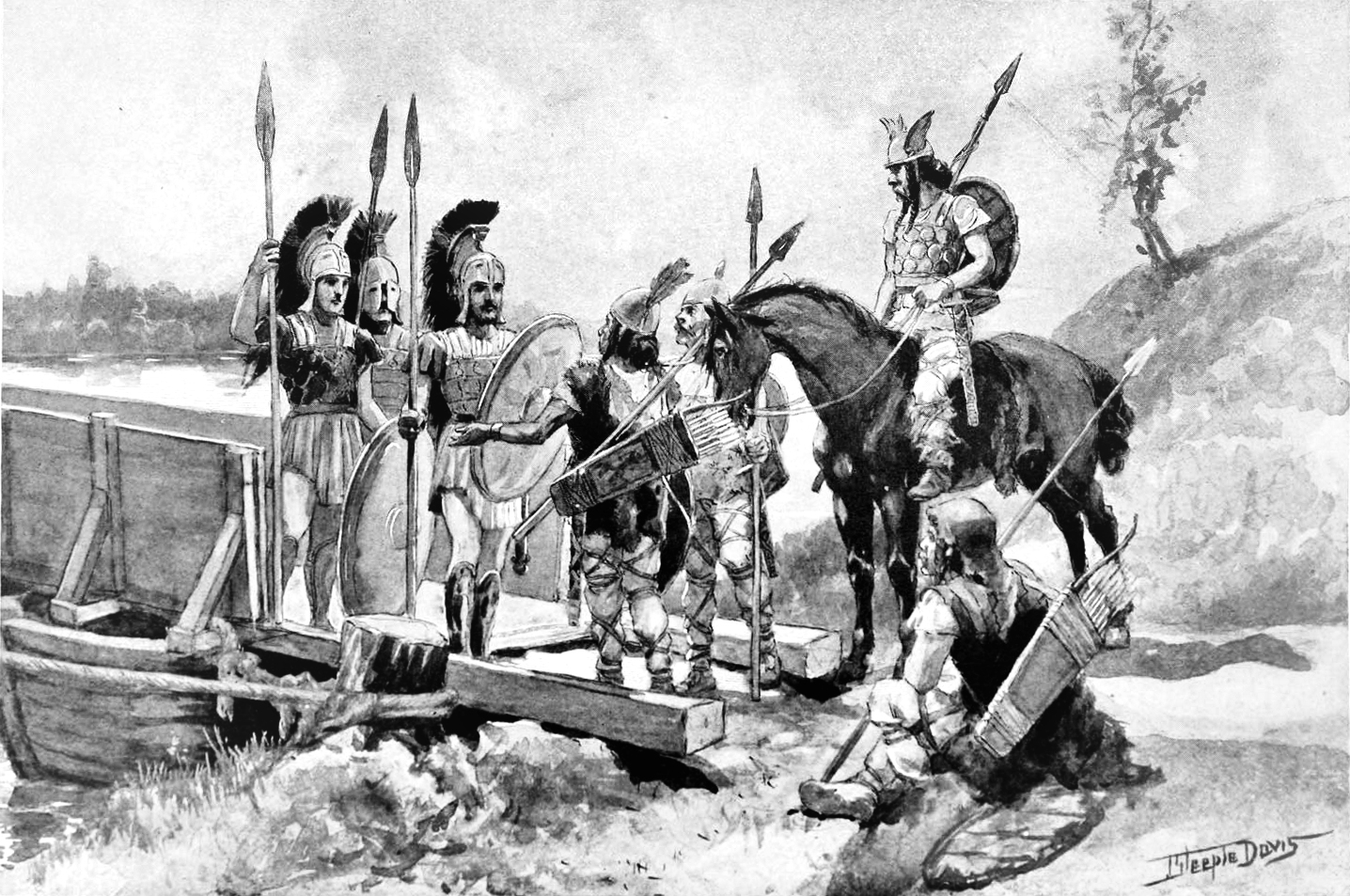
The Greeks under Histiaeus preserve the bridge of Darius I across the Danube river. 19th century illustration.

According to Herodotus, Histiaeus, along with the other Chiefs/Tyrants under Darius' rule, took part in the Persian expedition against the Scythians, and was put in charge of defending the bridge that Darius' troops had placed across the Danube River. The Scythians attempted to persuade Histiaeus and the others to abandon the bridge; one faction, led by Miltiades of Athens, at that time tyrant of the Chersonese, wanted to follow the Scythians' advice. However, Histiaeus argued that they should stay, as they owed their positions as tyrants to Darius and would surely be overthrown if he were killed.

Instead, according to Herodotus, Histiaeus suggested that they pretend to follow the Scythian plan. So Histiaeus was sent as an ambassador to the Scythians to tell them that the tyrants would accept the Scythian plan, while the rest of the tyrants acted as if they were demolishing the bridge. Histiaeus persuaded the Scythians to look for the Persian forces.

Herodotus writes that while the Scythians were away, the Persians returned to the Danube and Histiaeus organised the ships to successfully ferry them across the river.

During the expedition, Histiaeus' troops had started building a settlement at Myrcinus (site of the later Amphipolis) on the Strymon River. After returning with Darius to Sardis, Darius asked Histiaeus what he wanted in return for his service. Histiaeus responded that he wanted to be given control over Myrcinus, to which Darius agreed.

However, the Persian commander Megabazus suspected Histiaeus' interest in the strategically important area, which controlled key roads from Persian controlled territory into Europe, as well as known sources of silver and timber. Nevertheless, Darius considered Histiaeus to be loyal, and asked him to come back to Susa with him as a friend and advisor. Histiaeus' nephew and son-in-law Aristagoras was left in control of Miletus.

== Ionian revolt (499-494 BC) ==
However, according to Herodotus, Histiaeus was unhappy having to stay in Susa, and made plans to return to his position as King of Miletus by instigating a revolt in Ionia. In 499 BC, he shaved the head of his most trusted slave, tattooed a message on his head, and then waited for his hair to grow back. The slave was then sent to Aristagoras, who was instructed to shave the slave's head again and read the message, which told him to revolt against the Persians. Aristagoras, who was disliked by his own subjects after an expedition to Naxos ended in failure, followed Histiaeus' command, and with help from the Athenians and Eretrians, attacked and burned Sardis. When Darius learned of the revolt, he sent for Histiaeus, who pretended to have no knowledge of its origins, but asked to be sent back to Miletus to put down the revolt. Herodotus writes that Darius permitted him to leave.

On his way back, Histiaeus went to Sardis, where the satrap Artaphernes suspected Histiaeus' role in the revolt, forcing Histiaeus to flee to Chios. Histiaeus tried unsuccessfully to build a fleet while on Chios. He then returned to Miletus with the aim of becoming tyrant once more. However, the Miletians did not want a return to tyranny and exiled him to Lesbos. There, he gathered some ships and, according to Herodotus, began committing acts of piracy in the Black Sea and the Aegean Sea from a base in Byzantium.

Meanwhile, the Persians defeated the leaders of the Ionian revolt at the Battle of Lade in 494 BC. When Histiaeus learned of this he left Byzantium, and his troops attacked Chios, blockaded Thasos and then attempted to land on the mainland to attack the Persians. After joining a Greek force in battle against the Persians, he was captured by the Persian general, Harpagus in 493 BC. The satrap Artaphernes did not want to send him back to Susa, where he suspected that Darius would pardon him, so he executed him by impaling, and sent his head to Darius. According to Herodotus, Darius still did not believe Histiaeus was a traitor and gave his head an honourable burial.

== See also ==
- Istiea (Ancient: Histiaea)
