= Aristagoras =

Greek tyrant of the Ionian city of Miletus (died 497/6 BC)

- Ἀρισταγόρας
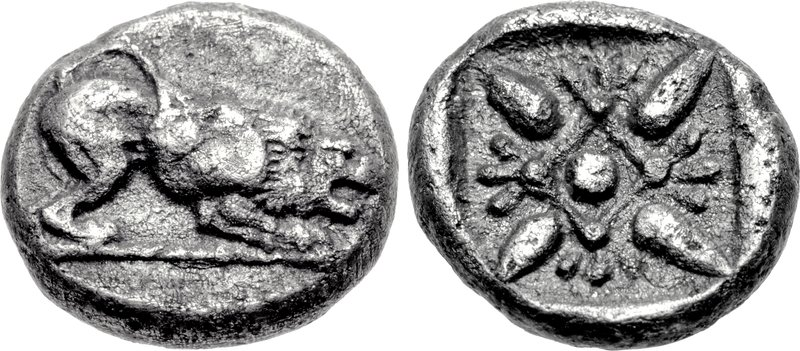
- Coinage of Miletus at the time of Aristagoras. 5th century BC.
- Died: 497/496 BC; Myrcinus
- Cause of death: Military combat against the Thracians
- Other name: ὁ Μιλήσιος ("the Milesian")
- Occupation: Governor of the city-state of Miletus
- Employer: Persian Empire
- Known for: Instigation of the Ionian revolt
- Title: Tyrant (Tyrannos) of Miletus
- Predecessor: Histiaeus
- Political party: Ionia
- Movement: Ionian independence
- Opponent: Persian Empire
- Criminal charges: Traitor
- Criminal penalty: Death
- Criminal status: Rebel in the field
- Father: Molpagoras

Aristagoras of Miletus (Ancient Greek: Ἀρισταγόρας ὁ Μιλήσιος), d. 497/496 BC, was the deputy of the Ionian city of Miletus in the late 6th century BC and early 5th century BC. He acted as one of the instigators of the Ionian Revolt against the Persian Achaemenid Empire. He was the son-in-law of Histiaeus and was appointed the deputyship of Miletus by him.

The Greeks had won the coast of Asia Minor from the preceding Hittite Empire during the Bronze Age, and thanks to their victory at Troy had kept it during the fall of the empire and retirement of the Hittites to Syria. They shared the coast with the Phrygians coming in from the Balkans, but neither were prepared for the armed invasion of their lands by the Persians during the late 6th-century BC. The Ionian Greeks appealed to the mainland Greeks for assistance and not receiving it were forced to capitulate, becoming subjects of the new Achaemenid Empire. However, as long as they paid their taxes and were no threat to the rule of the Persians, the latter were willing to allow them self-rule under the Greek tyrants. The entire region, however, including those tyrants, held a smoldering resentment against the Persian Empire.

Aristagoras is of historical note for his instigation of the Ionian revolt in collaboration with his father-in-law and predecessor, Histiaeus. The conspiracy gained the support of many Greek Ionian states but failed to win the full support of the mainland Greek states. Consequently, the Persians came down upon the Ionian Greeks in overwhelming numbers, sacking the rebel cities, including Miletus. At Miletus, the Persians killed all the warriors, castrated the young men, and sold the women and children into slavery. It was their intent that Miletus would never again be repopulated, and for some decades it was not.

Aristagoras, prior to the sacking of Miletus, had led a contingent of colonists to Thrace. Despite advice not to do so, Aristagoras took up occupation of the city of Myrcinus. He would then lay siege to another Thracian city, where he and all his men would be killed in combat. The first Persian invasion of mainland Greece would occur two years after the defeat of the Ionians. In 492 BC the Persian king Darius would order a naval attack in retaliation against Athens and Eretria for supporting the Greeks in the Ionian Revolt.

== Background ==
Map of the ancient Greek western coast of Anatolia. Ionia is in green. Miletus and Naxos are shown.

By the time extant history hears of him, Aristagoras was already serving as deputy governor of Miletus, a polis on the western coast of Anatolia around 500 BC. He was the son of Molpagoras. Aside from his paternal relationship, little is known about him. He was also the son-in-law of Histiaeus, whom the Persians had set up as tyrant but did not trust. After general Megabazus presented his complaints about Histiaeus to Darius I of Persia, the latter summoned Histiaeus to his court and detained him at Susa, the reason given was that he wanted a trustworthy advisor. On the recommendation of Histiaeus, the Achaemenids then appointed Aristagoras as the new ruler of Miletus. Aristagoras ruled Miletus while Histiaeus remained in Susa, kept under observation away from his troops.

Timeline of Aristagoras
511 BC	Histiaeus cedes his position as tyrant of Miletus to his son-in-law, Aristagoras.
502 BC	Naxos revolts against Persia, and asks Aristagoras for support. The invasion ends in disaster.
499 BC	Histiaeus encourages Aristagoras to rebel.
499 BC	Aristagoras starts a rebellion of the city of Miletus against Achaemenid rule.
498 BC	Aristagoras looks for Greek allies. Cleomenes I of Sparta refuses to help. Athens offers help.
497 BC	With the help of Athens, the rebels capture and burn Sardis, the capital of the Achaemenid satrapy of Lydia. Miltiades, tyrant of the Chersonese, flees to Athens.
494 BC	The Ionian revolt is put down by the Achaemenids, Miletus is sacked. Aristagoras flees to Thrace, but is killed by the Thracians.

Aristagoras was the main driver of the Ionian Revolt on secret instruction from Histiaeus, when the latter learned of Persian plans to interfere directly in Miletus. Aristagoras took advantage of Greek dissatisfaction with Persian rule to incite an alliance of the Greek poleis of Ionia.

== Failure of the Naxos expedition ==
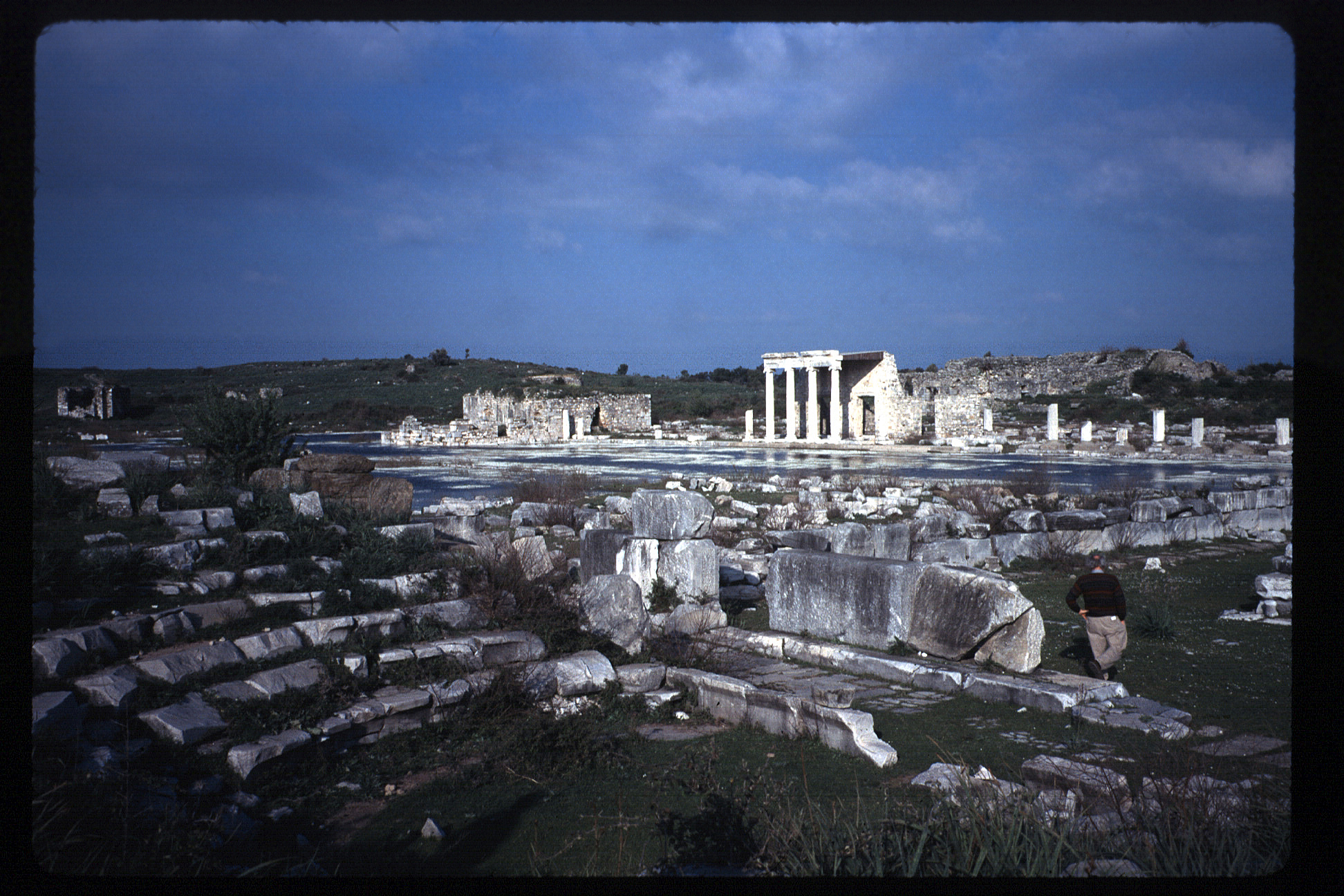
Ruins of Miletus

Certain exiled citizens of Naxos came to Miletus to seek refuge. They asked Aristagoras to supply them with troops, so that they could regain control of their homeland. Aristagoras considered that if he was able to supply troops to the Naxians, then he could become ruler of Naxos. So he agreed to assist the Naxians. He explained that he did not have enough troops of his own, but that Artaphernes, Darius' brother and the Persian satrap of Lydia, who commanded a large army and navy on the coast of Asia, could help supply troops. The Naxians agreed to Aristagoras seeking Artaphernes' support and supplied him with money.

Aristagoras travelled to Sardis and suggested that Artaphernes attack Naxos and restore the exiles. The Persians would then gain control of the island. He explained to Artaphernes that Naxos “was a fine and fertile island, close to the Ionian coast, and rich both in treasures and slaves.” It was also the gateway to the Cyclades, which the Persians did not yet rule. Aristagoras promised that he would both fund the expedition and give Artaphernes a bonus sum. He also tempted Artaphernes by adding that capturing the island would place other poleis of the Cyclades under his control. They would serve as bases for an invasion of Euboea. After securing the permission of Susa, Artaphernes agreed and promised 200 ships.

The following spring, Aristagoras and the Naxian exiles sailed with the fleet. Unfortunately for the success of the invasion, Aristagoras quarreled with the Persian admiral Megabates. He interfered in Magabates' role in disciplining the ship captains to save a friend from harsh punishment for an infraction (failure to set a watch on his ship). Aristagoras saved his friend from punishment but lost the support of the Persian admiral, who expected to be in overall command. The schism was irreparable with Megabates deciding to sabotage the entire operation by secretly informing the Naxians that they were about to be attacked, taking away the element of surprise. Naxos then had enough time to prepare for a siege. Four months later, the siege still held, the Persians were out of supplies and had only limited funds remaining. The expedition was then considered a failure and the Persians sailed home.

== Ionian Revolt ==
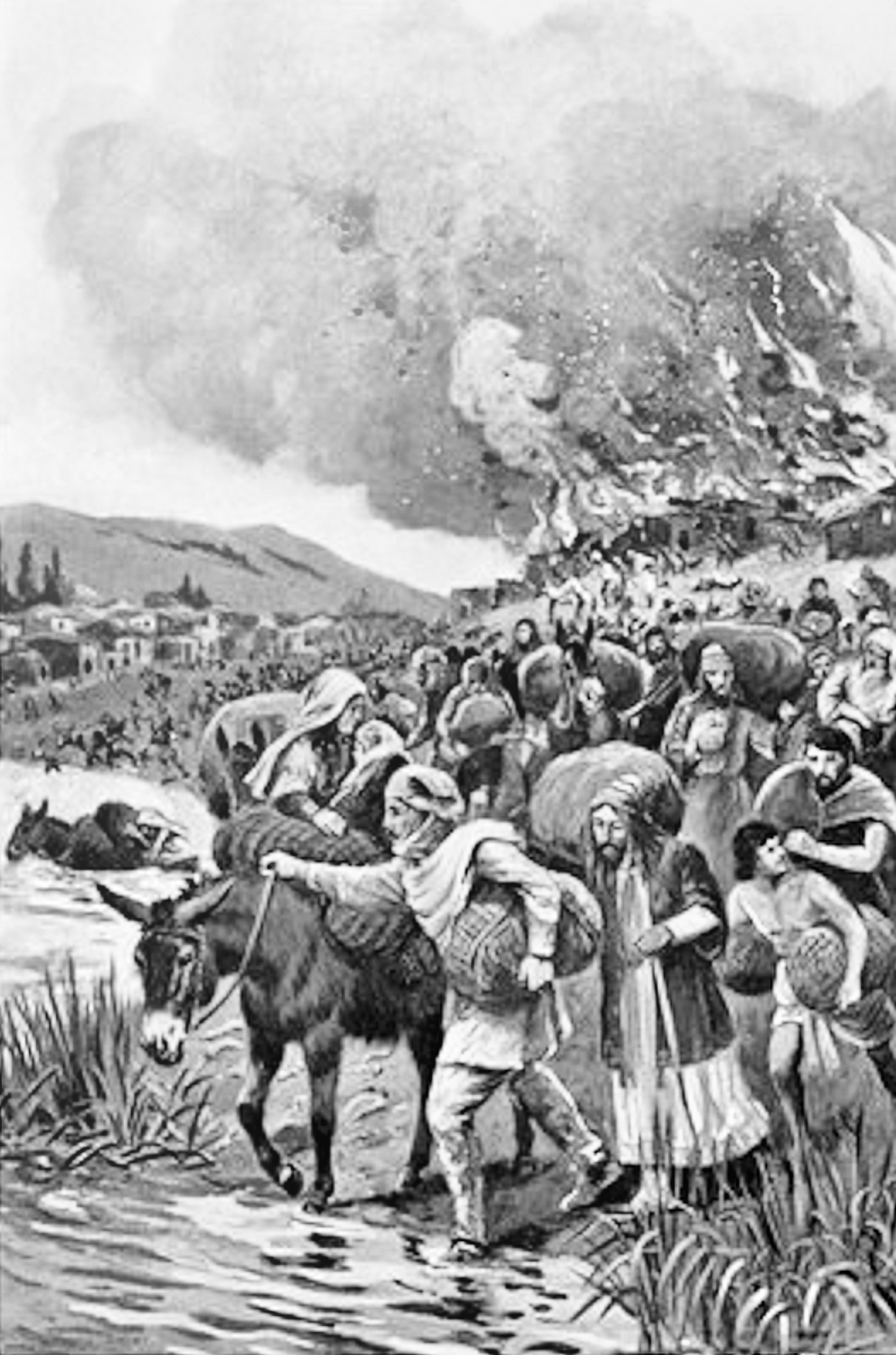
The burning of Sardis, capital of the Asia Minor Satrapy of Lydia, during the Ionian Revolt in 498 BC.

Due to his failure to make good on his Naxian promises, Aristagoras' political position was at risk. He began to plan a revolt with the Milesians and the other Ionians. Meanwhile, Histiaeus, still detained at Susa, had tattooed a message upon the shaved head of a slave. Once his hair had grown back, he sent him to Aristagoras. The message told Aristagoras to revolt. Histiaeus, desperate to resume his authority at Miletus, hoped Darius would send him to deal with a Milesian revolt.

Both leaders being of the same mind, Aristagoras conferred with a council of his supporters, who agreed to a rebellion in Miletus in 499 BC. Aristagoras was supported by most of the citizens in council, except the historian Hecataeus. Hecataeus voted against the revolt because he believed that the Ionians would be out-matched with defeat being inevitable. Once the vote was taken, however, there is no evidence that he excluded himself from the revolt. In fact, he had suggestions to make. Once the war began, the Ionians expected all to participate, although they could not stop the larger allies from withdrawing.

As soon as the vote for war was certain, Aristagoras took steps to secure the nearby Persian ships. The Naxos fleet was recovering from its ordeal at Myus. Now in a position of command, Herodotus is not specific, Aristagoras sent a party under Iatragoras to arrest the admirals still with the fleet, some several men. Ironically, these were mainly Greek. They were later released and sent home. Now that the rebellion was in the open, Aristagoras “set himself to damage Darius in every way he could think of”.

The scope of the revolt spread rapidly to all Ionia. Aristagoras foresaw that one city against the Persians would soon be crushed. He therefore set about creating an alliance of all the Ionian cities, but the members also came from regions beyond Ionia. He made a number of constitutional changes, not all of which are clear. First he relinquished his own tyranny. Approaching the other states, he convinced them to end theirs. Finally he ordered all of the states to create a board of generals to report, apparently, to him. When his government was in place he sailed to Lacedaemon and other states of Greece in search of allies.

There has been some question as to the exact meaning of Herodotus' governmental terms, and as to the form of government of the Ionian alliance. The most fundamental question is where Aristagoras got his authority over the Ionians in the first place. They were all under the satrapy of Lydia, not under Miletus. The satrap was Persian. The tyrant of Miletus was appointed by the satrap, but he also appointed all the other tyrants. For reasons not specified in Herodotus, Miletus took the lead.

One can only assume a leadership role of some kind of Aristagoras over the other tyrants, whether personal or according to some unspecified convention. In order to gain the participation of the people in the revolt, it was said that Aristagoras "let go" the tyranny and established isonomia, which translates roughly as "equality of government." According to Liddell and Scott, a standard dictionary of ancient Greek, Thucydides used it to mean the "equality of rights" in a democracy.

Aristagoras went on to "put a stop to tyranny" in all the other Ionian cities, and moreover to insist that they select boards of generals reporting to him. No voting is mentioned. Apparently a new sovereign entity had been formed with Aristagoras at its head. The state had the power to levy taxes and troops. Aristagoras was commander of the joint armed forces. Miletus was to be the new capital. The newly sovereign Ionia issued its own coinage between 499 and its destruction by the Persians in 494.

== Spartan refusal to provide assistance ==
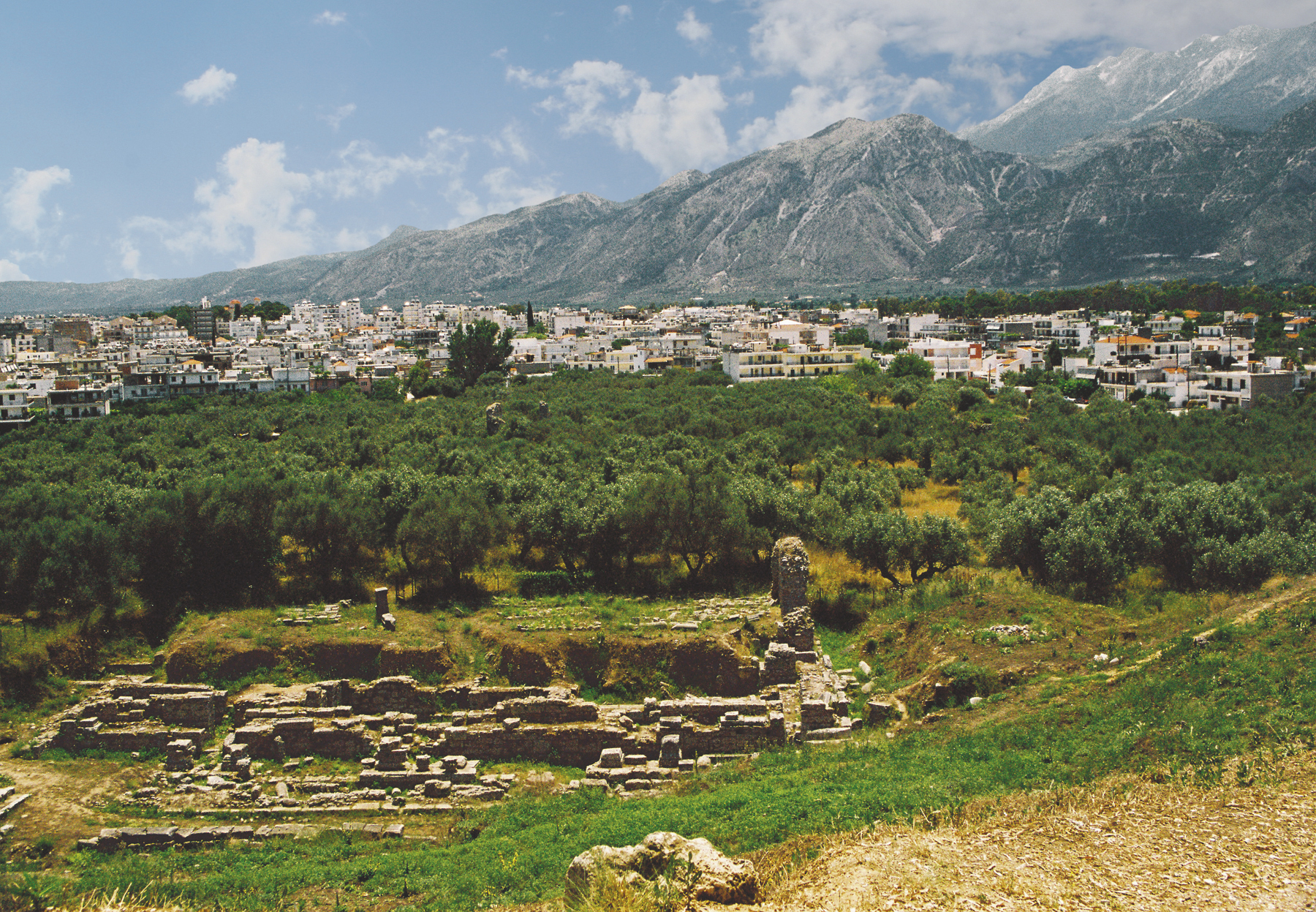
Ruins of Sparta

In 499 BCE. Aristagoras appealed to the Spartan king, Cleomenes I, for military aid in his revolt. He praised the quality of the Spartan warriors and argued that a pre-emptive invasion of Persia would be easy. To illustrate his view, he had brought along a "bronze tablet on which a map of all the earth was engraved, and all the sea, and all the rivers." No more information is given about the map, but some scholars have argued that Aristagoras borrowed the map from Hecataeus of Miletus, or Anaximander of Miletus.

Aristagoras claimed that the Persians would be easy to defeat, as they fought in "trousers and turbans". He also tempted the Spartan king with Persian riches. Cleomenes asked Aristagoras to wait two days for an answer. When they next met, Cleomenes asked how long it would take to reach Susa, and upon learning that it was a three months’ journey, he firmly refused Spartan assistance as his troops would be gone for too long. At the time, Sparta was concerned over possible attacks from the Argives. The Greek historian Herodotus claimed that Aristagoras attempted to change Cleomenes’ mind with bribes, until the king's young daughter Gorgo warned that Aristagoras would corrupt him. Aristagoras left without the requested assistance.

== Defeat of the Athenians ==
Aristagoras next went to Athens, where he made a convincing speech, promising "everything that came into his head, until at last he succeeded". Won over, the Athenians agreed to send ships to Ionia and Aristagoras went before them. The Athenians subsequently arrived in Miletus with twenty triremes and five others belonging to the Eretrians. Herodotus described the arrival of these ships as the beginning of troubles between the Greeks and the barbarians. Once all his allies had arrived, Aristagoras put his brother Charopinus and another Milesian, Hermophantus, in charge of the expedition, and the whole contingent set out for the provincial capital, Sardis, while Aristagoras remained to govern from Miletus.

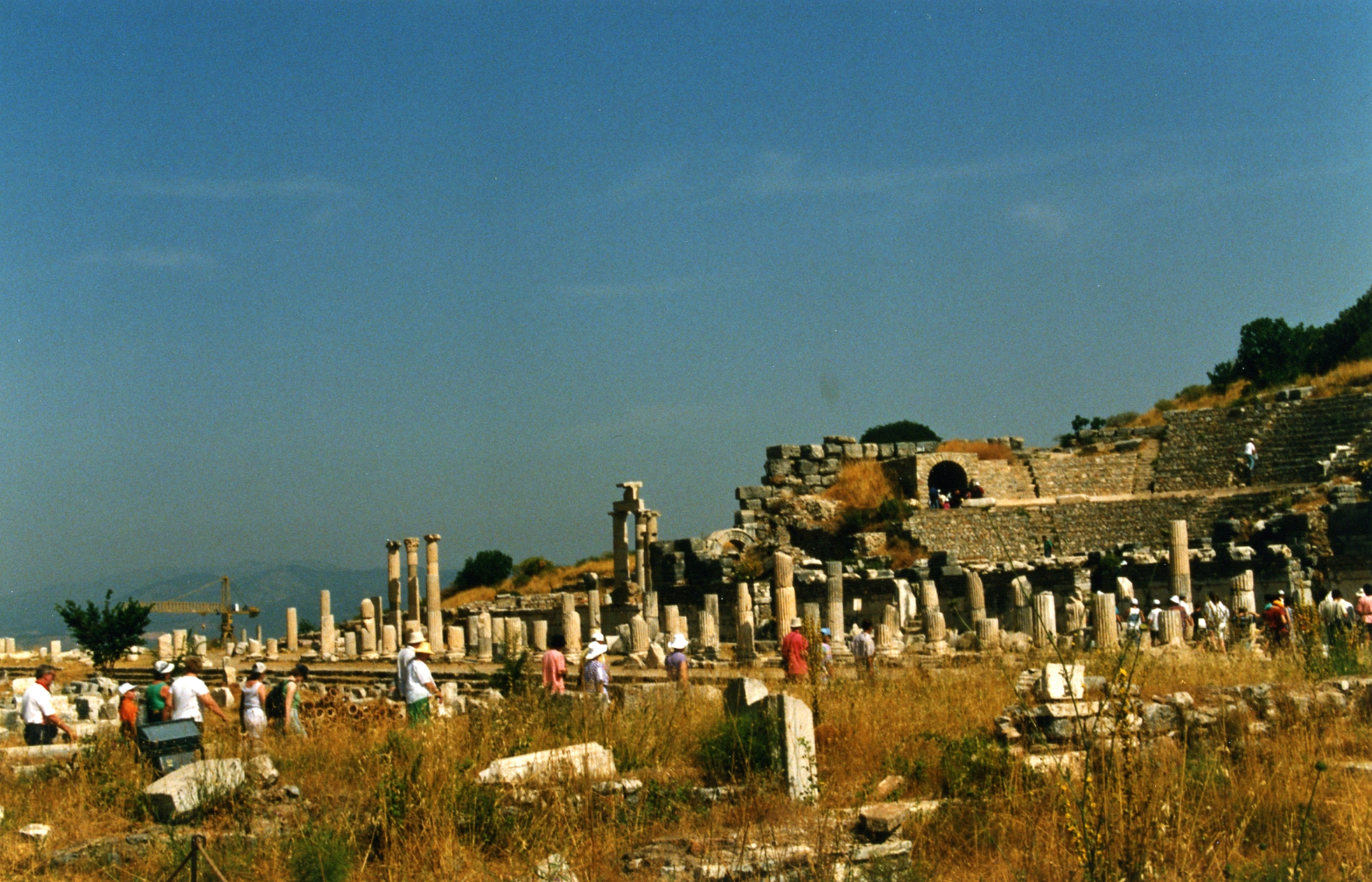
Ruins of Ephesus

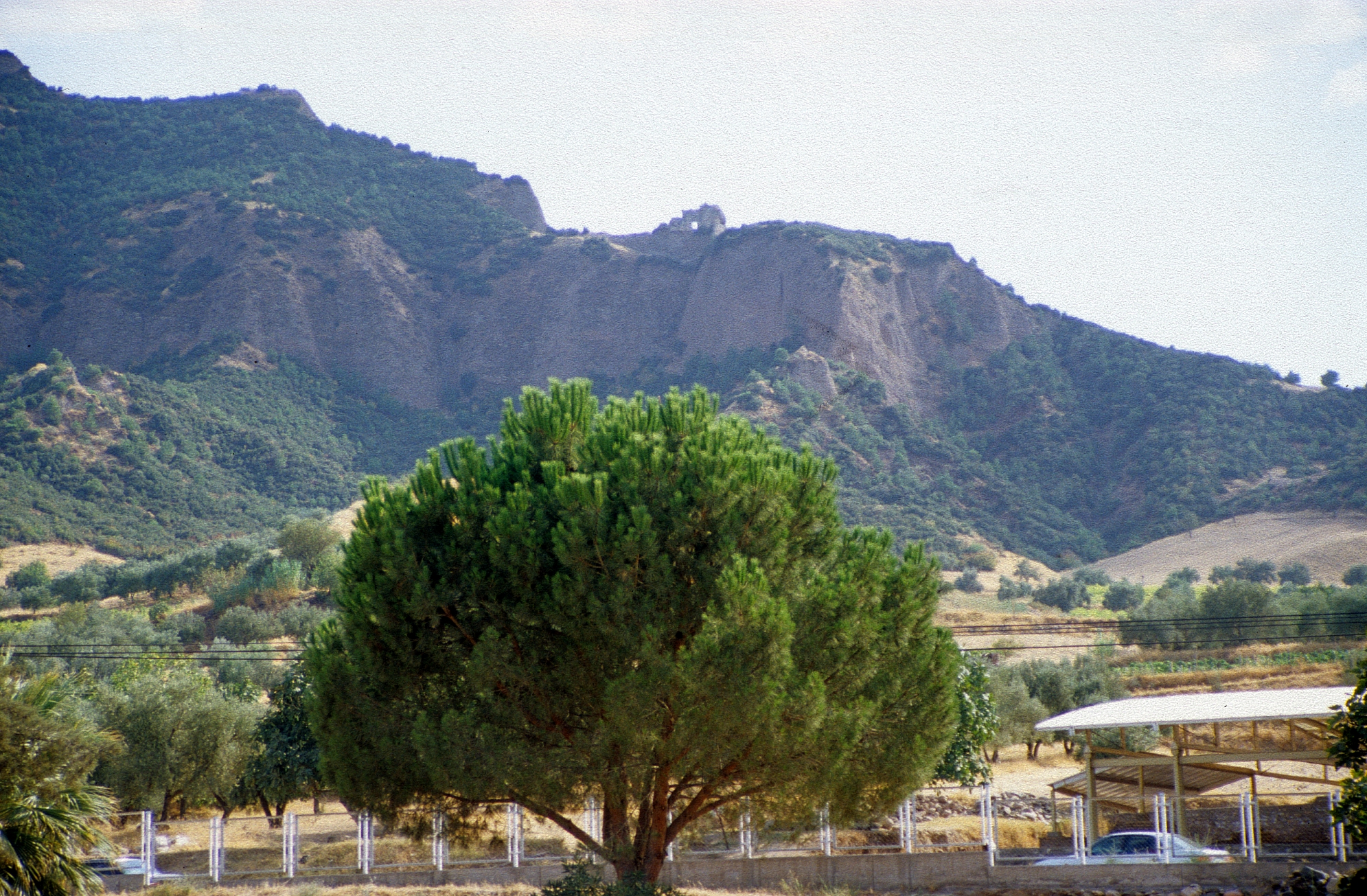
The acropolis at Sardis, now forested and eroded, with a few pinnacles of ruins.

The first leg of the journey was to proceed along the coast to Ephesus. Using it as base, they went overland to Sardis, on which they descended on the city taking its defenders by surprise. The satrap Artaphernes and his forces retreated to the acropolis immediately. A fire, started allegedly by accident in the town, burned down the temple of the Lydian goddess Cybebe (Cybele). Attributing the fire to Ionian maliciousness, the Persians later used it as an excuse for burning Greek temples.

The fire forced the defenders of the acropolis to abandon it in favor of the marketplace. Its defense coincided fortuitously with the arrival of Persian reinforcements. Interpreting the tumult as a counter-attack, the Ionians retreated to Tmolus, a nearby hill, from which they escaped by night. The reinforcements followed the Ionians, caught up with them near Ephesus and soundly defeated them.

The Persians had conquered Lydia, including all the Greek cities located in that state. They made such a show of mercy as to win the hearts and minds of the Anatolians, as well as of some of the Greeks. A call for assistance went rapidly around the satrapy. Joint Persian-Anatolian forces hastened overnight to the assistance of the satrap.

They arrived with such short notice and major fanfare as to frighten away the Ionian-Athenian forces. The Cambridge Ancient History article attributes this swift arrival to the Persian cavalry, which also had no trouble tracking and catching the Ionians before the gates of Ephesus. The losses of the mainland Greeks were so great that they sought to return home, leaving Aristagoras and the rebels to fend for themselves. An air of doom pervaded the revolt, but they fought with such spirit that the rebellion spilled over into the nearby Greek islands.

After this battle, the Athenians refused to continue to fight in the Ionian Revolt and returned to Athens. However, because of Athenians' participation in the revolt, the Persian king, Darius, swore vengeance on Athens and commanded a servant to repeat to him three times every day at dinner, “Master, remember the Athenians”. This may only be a story (but not necessarily on that account false), as the Persians intended expansion into the Balkans all along. They still held parts of Thrace from their previous abortive expedition into Scythia, only stopped when they learned the true size of the country (most of southern Russia) and the danger of their position in it.

The Ionians fought on, gaining control of Byzantium and the surrounding towns as well as the greater part of Caria. They were not, however, alone. In this last phase of the conflict, almost all of Cyprus also rebelled against the Persians. Onesilus, the younger brother of Gorgus, the ruler of Salamis, tried to convince his brother to rebel against Persia and join in the Ionian Revolt. When his brother refused to support the revolt, Onesilus waited until he left Salamis and then shut the city gates on him. Gorgus fled to the Persians while Onesilus took over and convinced the Cyprians to revolt. They then proceeded to lay siege to the city of Amathus.

== Aftermath ==
Well before the revolt collapsed, Aristagoras began looking for a shelter to which he could execute a strategic retreat. He and his men resolved on Myrcinus in Thrace, which had been an Ionian stronghold in the abortive Persian invasion of Scythia. He put Pythagoras, "a man of distinction", in charge of Miletus and set sail for Thrace, where he attempted to establish a colony on the Strymon river, at the same site as the later Athenian colony of Amphipolis.

The Thracians, not now disposed to tolerate any further presence of Greeks in their country, opposed this incursion. He gained control of the territory but later, while besieging a neighboring town, Aristagoras was killed in battle.

Expecting a swift Persian victory, Aristagoras had hoped to establish a redoubt of Ionians, who would come to the assistance of Miletus at a later time. By an accidental sequence of historical events his reputation drew the ire of his main historian, Herodotus of Halicarnassus, an Ionian partisan, to such a degree that it suffers yet.

In the last months of the failing revolt, the Persians were reconquering the rebel Ionians city by city. When all was nearly lost, the Persian king Darius was convinced by Histiaeus that he could settle the conflict and now should be sent back to Miletus.

Histiaeus never succeeded in reaching Miletus. Reporting first to Sardis, whether with or without the Great King's complicity (Herodotus does not say), he was interrogated concerning his true loyalties. Histiaeus swore complete ignorance of the events of the revolt and unquestionable loyalty to the Persians. He admitted nothing, but the satrap, Artaphernes, was not in the least deceived. He said, "I will tell thee how the case stands, Histaeus: this shoe is of thy stitching; Aristagoras has but put it on."

Recognizing that he risked arrest or worse at the hands of Artaphernes, Histiaeus escaped that night and took ship at the coast, probably at Ephesus. He had no trouble raising troops and finding ships, but he found that he was not trusted by the Ionians. Miletus would not have him back. He became a mercenary in the Aegean until he was hunted down and executed by Artaphernes. The Ionian Revolt finally ended in 494/493 BC. The Persians went on to prepare for the conquest of Greece under the pretext of a punitive campaign against Athens.

Due to the disparity in resources and the reluctance of the mainland Greek states to involve themselves, the Ionian Revolt failed and Persia regained control over the Ionian Greeks. After only one year, the Cyprians were once again forced into submission by Persia. The cities around the Hellespont fell one after another to Daurises, the son-in-law of king Darius. The Carians fought the Persians at the Meander River and were defeated with severe casualties. Cyprus was recaptured by Persian and Phoenician forces.

The revolt was over by 494/493 BC. Aiming directly for Miletus in 494 BC, the Persians defeated the Ionians in the naval Battle of Lade, an island off Miletus. The city was then subject to a siege and the war lost at its fall. Although there was some mild destruction of rebel cities (except for Miletus, which was razed and the population decimated and transported), the Persians were interested in ruling rather than revenge. They began to plan for the invasion of Greece which was to start in 490 BC in a series of conflicts which are now known as the Greco-Persian Wars.

== Herodotus as a source ==
Most of the information on Aristagoras and his actions comes from the writings of the ancient Greek historian Herodotus. On the one hand he is virtually the only literary source for the events he presents as history. While in many ways he reflects some of the best of ancient historiography, on the other hand, his work is sprinkled with motivational and logical lacunae, creating textual paradoxes everywhere, causing some scholars to be critical of his value as a historical source, especially regarding the Ionian Revolt. Views amongst historians on Herodotus' work can be split into two camps: the skeptical, discrediting Herodotus as an unreliable source, and the affirmative, who credit him with being reliable in many matters albeit with particular biases understandable at the time he wrote.

=== The skeptical view ===
Manville had a skeptical view concerning an imaginary power struggle between Aristagoras and Histiaeus isolated from the usual contexts of war and society. Manville has no confidence in Herodotus' ability to relate connected history and therefore supplies connections for him out of his own speculations. He was preceded in this method by the earlier work of Mabel Lang. A 1968 article by Lang focuses on the paradoxes of the Ionian revolt. For example, Histiaeus originally won the Great King's favor by protecting his escape from Scythia over a key bridge of the Danube. Despite this vital rescue to save the king and all his forces, he shortly after plots a rebellion.

Lang suggests that one might conclude to an ulterior motive at the bridge, "to ingratiate himself with Darius so that he could be on the inside of the king's policy". Apparently, to be on the inside of his policy he has to save his life and the lives of all his army by letting him escape from the large Scythian army not far behind. He prefers to keep him alive for nothing more serious than keeping an eye on him. Nonchalantly Lang writes: "Presumably revolt was already in the air,...." It could not have been far in the air if Histiaeus passed up a chance for total victory at the outset, a prized goal of many a lightning campaign in world history afterwards.

The basic problem is Lang's cynicism: "we should not hope to discover the truth about the result merely by accepting the narrative ...." Accordingly, she rehearses a catalogue of paradoxes similar to Manville's weaving her own fantasy of unattested events to contain it. Her explanation of why such a tale is necessary is similarly speculative: "the failure of the revolt not only gave prominence to every aspect and event which would explain, justify or anticipate the disastrous results but also cast into the shade any intentions which deserved a better fate and any temporary successes during the course of the war". Not having any other account with which to compare these events, she cannot possibly know that.

=== The affirmative view ===
The cynical view described above reflects a difference in expectation between Herodotus and his target audiences, which by the accidents of time are multiple and various. He did not write for us moderns. Reading that he was the first historian whose work survived in anything more than scattered fragments, we expect him to have the proper concern of modern historians for continuity and causality, which other ancient historians, such as Thucydides, have. Herodotus is not one of those. With regard to causation, the Cambridge Ancient History article asserts: “...Herodotus does not seem to have innovated: he merely accepted the causation appropriate to his subject and period.”

It would be convenient to attribute this unconcern to a sort of intermediate phase between mythology and history, as many do. Such a view is neglectful of the ravages of time. Herodotus was not the first historian in any way, only the first whose work survived. He wrote of the Ionian Revolt a full generation after it happened; moreover, he was not a participant. He relied on the work of several previous historians at Miletus, of which fragments and mention have survived, chief of which was Hecataeus of Miletus.

Herodotus apparently designed his work according to a specific plan and style. Whether the previous historians used it is not known, due to the paucity of evidence, but it seems unlikely. He appears to use Hecataeus as a framework for his historical events. The fragments of Hecataeus suggest that he wrote only an annal-like sequence long on names and events but short on connecting narrative. To this framework Herodotus adds the logoi, or independent anecdotes of persons and events derived from independent oral traditions, which Herodotus obtained by interview with record-keepers and state historians. The disconnectedness comes from their being independent. It is pointless, therefore, to try to invent connections.

The ancient historians have therefore invented a special category for Herodotus, that he was a logographer, or teller of logoi, based on his own characterization of his sources as logopoeic, "story makers". Usually the logographers include Hecataeus and the other historians of his generation, who lived through the revolt. There is little evidence of their logography. Whether Herodotus stands alone or is part of a Milesian tradition is a matter of speculation.

Validation of Herodotus therefore rests on validation of his logoi. There is no general validation, but the much-desired archaeological and inscriptional evidence appears to validate a few events as far as they go: some names, circumstances of war, and similar peripheral facts. He cannot be validated as a modern historian, but he does have an overall design, which is “Biblical” or "Bible-like" in scope. He is trying to do an epic in prose similar to the Homerica in verse. His topic is not the Trojan War, but the Graeco-Persian Wars. (The Homerica have been called the pagan Greek "Bible".) Says Oswyn Murray in the Cambridge Ancient History,

It is certainly hard to find fault with his general view that the only adequate explanation for the Persian Wars must be a complete account of relations between the two peoples since the conquest of the Ionian cities in 545 B.C.

The expectation of modernity in Herodotus is misplaced. Validation must be sought for individual logoi. The whole work or any part of it cannot logically be condemned on the basis of one or a group of paradoxes. All skepticism must have a reason for doubting. The inconsistencies of Herodotus are not a valid reason, which is generally true. But few stories are ever free of inconsistency, and if they are, they are suspect on that account ("too good to be true").

Denials of Herodotus' validity, from mild to severe, although widespread, were never universal. As an example of ancient information generally agreed to be invalid, many works attributed to various authors have been placed in the "pseudo-" category after as much as centuries of review. There was never any such universal and long-standing denial of Herodotus. On the contrary, the main events, such as the Battles of Marathon and Thermopylae, have been accepted as basically credible by many scholars of many ages. It is therefore misplaced to speak of the "rehabilitation" of Herodotus in medical or neo-ideologic terms.

Accordingly, the most sanguine view treats his work as though no problems exist regarding it. Referring to the Cambridge Ancient History article on the Ionian Revolt by Murray, Georges addresses "the question of Herodotus' veracity and reliability." Repeating Murray's criticism that "the traditions concerning the revolt itself are ... fragmented into individual episodes of folly, treachery, or heroism" and therefore are not "trustworthy materials for the history of the revolt," he asserts to the contrary that "Herodotus' account furnishes the material for a coherent and credible account of the actions and events it presents...."

Having said this, Georges must now show that, rather than being paradoxical, Herodotus is coherent and credible. Like Lang, having no other account to offer, he must make his demonstrations from the text of Herodotus, which he spends the rest of the article doing, disputing most of Murray's interpretations. The contradictions are not to be viewed as contradictions. He does not address the question of why, if they are not so, it is necessary to spend an article in disputation over them. The result is a new set of speculations fully as imaginary as Murray's, not being based on any alternative texts.

There is hope, however, as fragments of Greek texts and inscriptions continue to be discovered. Meanwhile, it seems common knowledge that the public of any age is not going to relinquish credibility in Herodotus' great depiction of the Persian Wars.
