= Kurdushum =

Kurdushum or Kurdusum, was a region in Zagros Mountains, east of Tigris mentioned in an Elamite text of 6th century BC. Kurdushum is mentioned as paying tribute to Artazoastra daughter of king Darius the Great of Persia and wife of Mardonius son of Gobryas (Gubaru) governor of Qutium (Land of Qurtie). Kurdushum may be the Elamite variation of Akkadian Qutium, but this is not clear since Elamite texts are still predominantly undeciphered.

== See also ==
- Kurdistan
- Land of Karda
- Corduene
