= Vassal state =

State subordinate to another state

A vassal state is any state that has varying degrees of influence, but is obligated to a superior state or empire. Vassal states were seen among the empires of the Near East, dating back to the era of the Egyptian, Hittite, Caananite and Mitanni conflict, as well as in ancient China.

== Historical examples ==
=== Ancient Egypt ===
The reign of Thutmose III (1479 BC – 1425 BC) laid the foundations for the systems that functioned during the Amarna period of Egypt. Vassal states in the Levant became fully integrated in Egypt's economy with the construction of harbours – allowing for greater communication and collection of tax between Egypt and its vassal states during this period.

Most of what is known about Egypt's vassal states from the reigns of Amenhotep III and Tutankhamun (1390 BC – 1323 BC) stems from the Amarna letters – a collection of 350 cuneiform tablets. The different ways vassal rulers communicated with the Pharaoh via grovelling and obsequiousness is a key method of extrapolating relationships between Egypt and vassal states.

Egypt's key vassal states were located on the northern frontier, and included states such as Nuhašše, Qatna, and Ugarit. These were located on the fringes of the territory claimed by Egypt and were a potential threat from acting with the Hittites in Anatolia, or the Mitanni in Iraq and Syria. Due to these vassal states’ distance from the Nile, and their value as a buffer zone from rival kingdoms, these states appeared to have a more high-status relationship with the Pharaoh and Egypt. These states could also solicit the Pharaoh for various requests. The fulfilment of these asks by Egypt may have served the purpose of ensuring the loyalty of these distant vassal states. However, these vassal states were claimed by the Hittite Empire following the death of Akhenaten (1353 BC – 1336 BC) and were never reclaimed.

Under Ramesses II (1279 BC – 1213 BC), Egypt engaged in several military campaigns against the Hittites, eventually capturing the kingdoms of Kadesh and Amurru by taking advantage of growing problems in the Hittite Empire. In 1258 BC, Ramesses and the Hittite King Ḫattušili III signed a peace treaty that created a border from north of Byblos to Damascus between the two empires.

==== Byblos ====
The Kingdom of Byblos was significant in linking the worlds of Egypt, the Near East and the Aegean to one another. It is first attested during the reign of Thutmose III. Through Byblos, the Egyptians had access to products from Lebanon and Syria, while also using the kingdom as a base for military activity. Byblos held religious importance to Egypt, as the local goddess appeared in the form of Hathor, and was associated with Isis. Byblos was also valuable for Egypt as a trade partner, as it allowed the latter to interact with the regional trade connections between Byblos and other small cities. Byblos seemed to have a large amount of influence itself. Rib-Hadda's letters indicate that Byblos had control over its own territory, until it was taken in conflict with Amurru.

Correspondence with the Kingdom of Byblos is well documented, as the longest interaction between Egypt and a vassal state and spanned a period of 12 years. The subject king in these letters – Rib-Hadda – is unique among vassal rulers as his letters are more verbose than other small rulers in the Near East. Despite his loyalty to the Pharaoh, Rib-Hadda never received any meaningful reply from Egypt during times of need and was eventually exiled from his own kingdom by his brother.

While Rib-Hadda's brother was on the throne, Byblos continued to communicate with the Egyptians, although there is some contention over potential alliances between Byblos and Amurru and the Hittite Empire as well.

Interactions between Byblos and Egypt declined in the 12th and 11th centuries BC with the fall of the New Kingdom. Following Egypt's resurgence, kingdoms such as Tyre and Sidon were favoured over Byblos. By the Early Iron Age, Byblos no longer had connections to any great powers in the region. While the city still had religious authority until the Roman Empire, it had long lost its economic and political importance.

=== Hittite Empire ===
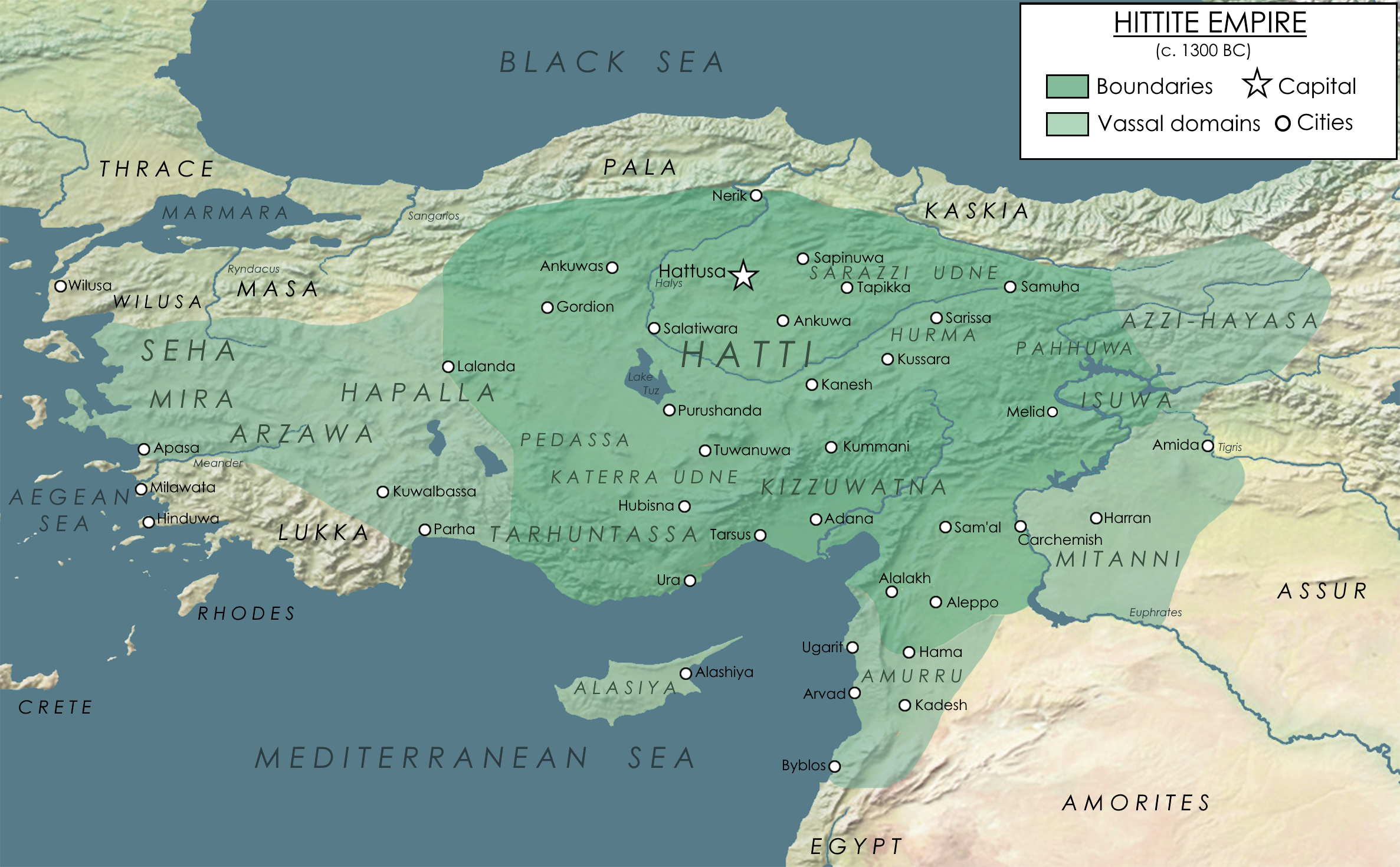
Map of the Hittite core territory and its vassal states around 1300 BC

The Hittite Empire incorporated vassal states that extended over much of Anatolia and Northern Syria. The addition of vassal states reached its peak under the reigns of Šuppiluliuma I and Muršili II in the 14th century BC. The relationships between the Hittites and their vassal states centered around the Hittite king and the vassal ruler; the terms of their relationship were imposed unilaterally by the former, and accepted by the latter. Whenever a new Hittite king or vassal ruler came into power, a new treaty would be drawn up.

In rare cases, local rulers were given kiurwana (protectorate status). While they had distinct privileges – such as exemption from tribute – they did not have any more freedom of activity than other vassal states. All relations among the regions under Hittite control were strictly determined by the king. While this led to the belief that contact between vassal states was limited, it has also been thought that such restrictions were limited to the enemies of the Hatti.

The treaties imposed on vassal states came with military obligations, though vassals were also promised military assistance in return. Some treaties also contained details of annual tribute. Treaties were often concluded with a marriage between a vassal ruler and a Hatti princess of the royal family. The princess would hold greater power than other wives of the vassal, and succession would pass down her descendants.

Vassal states were obliged to support and swear fealty to the king's legitimate successors as well. In the event of a usurper taking the throne, the vassal state was freed from all treaty obligations except to help restore a legitimate king to the throne. In doing so, vassal rulers were guaranteed sovereignty from themselves and their successors in their region.

==== Ugarit ====
The relations of Ugarit are the most well-known of the Hittite's vassal states. Sources on Ugarit's role and relationship with the Hittites mostly comes from the Ugarit Archives, with only a few from Hittite sources. From the sources, it is believed that Ugarit held economic and commercial importance to the Hittite Empire, as many letters and documents relate to trade. Ugarit also maintained a relationship with Egypt, due to contacts with the Pharaoh's court. Most evidence of this contact comes from the era of the Pax Hethitica, which came after peace between Egypt and the Hittite Empire.

==== Amurru ====
Amurru's relationship to the Hittite Empire is attested to in documents recovered from Ugarit and Hattusa. Unlike Ugarit, Amurru does not appear to have been a trading centre. Rather, Hittite sources place importance on the political and military role this kingdom played in the empire, as it was located on the border of Hatti territory and Egypt. Previously a vassal state of Egypt, the Kingdom defected to the Hittites under the ruler Aziru. Amurru was loyal to the Hittite Empire from the end of the Amarna Period until the reign of Muwatalli II, when they switched allegiances back to Egypt. The defection was punished with a temporary replacement of the king with a more loyal ruler. Two marriages occurred between Hittites and Amurru royalty at this time, raising Amurru's importance within the empire. Amurru's relationship with the Hittite Empire was maintained until the collapse of the latter in the 12th century BC. A shift from Semitic names used by descendants of Aziru suggest a lasting impact of Hittite influence in the region.

==== Carchemish ====
While Carchemish was a leading power in Syria and delegate for Syrian affairs, not much is known about their interactions with the Great Powers of the region. What is known comes from archives at Hattusa, Emar, and Ugarit. When the city was conquered by Suppiluliuma I, he installed his son on the throne Due to this, the later kings of Carchemish acted as representatives for the Hittite Empire in Syria. In the 13th century, Carchemish was trading directly with Assyria, and had relations with Babylonia as well. Carchemish also survived the end of the Hittite Empire, and became its own city-state in the Early Iron Age. In the 8th century BC, it was annexed by the Assyrian Empire.

=== Neo-Assyrian Empire ===
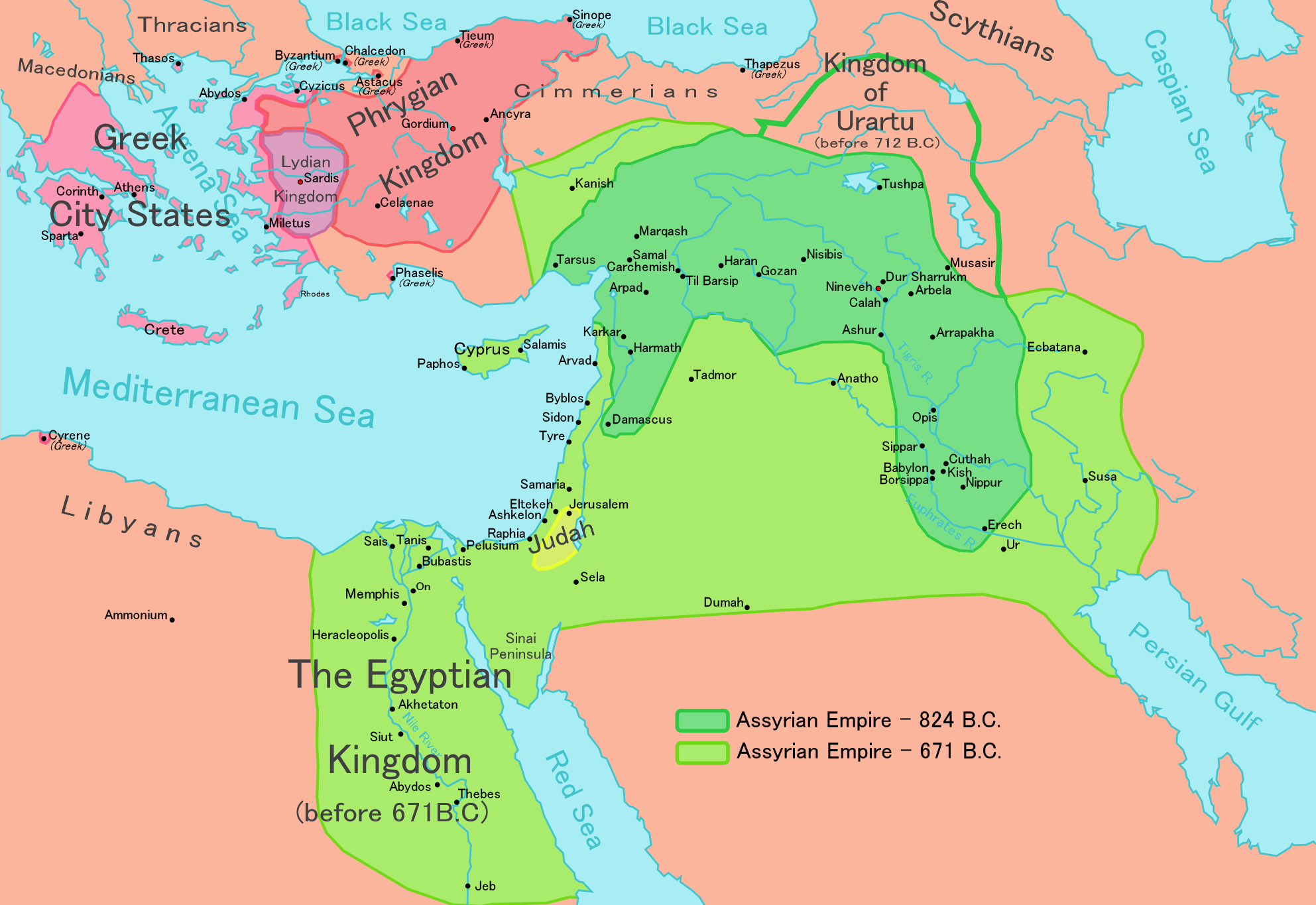
Map of Neo-Assyrian territories in 824 BC and 671 BC

The vassal states of the Neo-Assyrian Empire (911 BC – 609 BC) had a unique relationship with the empire they became a part of. While vassal states were necessary to the politics of the empire and connected by administrative and economic means, they are not considered to be ‘properly Assyrian’. Neo-Assyrian imperial ideology placed importance on unified diversity, and as such vassal states maintained a degree of cultural independence. While territorial expansion slowed in the 7th century BC, the amount of vassal states increased in number, suggesting a change in foreign policy.

Assyrian kings expressed their hold over vassal states through the collection of flora and fauna from these regions. The earliest records of this practice date back to Tiglath-Pileser I (1114 BC – 1076 BC) in the Middle Assyrian Period. It was revived by Ashurnasirpal in the Neo-Assyrian Period by creating a garden with specimens from across the empire. Later Neo-Assyrian rulers would expand on this practice; Sargon II created a garden that imitated the forests of Northern Syria, while Sennacherib created a swamp that reflected the landscape of Southern Babylonia. In artistic representations, subjects of vassal states are depicted bringing tribute to Assyria. These representatives are shown bowing or crouching before the king. The gifts offered range from horses and monkeys to wineskins. These scenes of tribute and audience with the king express how vassal states participated in the Neo-Assyrian Empire.

By the 8th century BC, the southern vassal states of the empire saw an increase in settlement. In comparison to the northern regions of the empire – which were previously devastated – these kingdoms become denser and the more prosperous parts of the empire. The kingdoms west of the Euphrates river were considered vassal states until the 7th century BC, when they were incorporated into the proper provincial system of the empire, though they still had various degrees of political control depending on location. In Judah, there was a further increase in settlement in the 7th century that was greater than the 8th. It was the same in Jordan, showing that Neo-Assyrian control over the region was a successful period for these kingdoms.

=== Achaemenid Persia ===
While the Persians made use of satraps (appointed Persian governors) rather than vassal rulers in subject regions, there were rare cases of vassal states being utilised. Herodotus writes that negotiations took place between King Amyntas I of Macedonia and the Persians after the former's subjugation by the Achaemenids by 513 BC. The Macedonians became further connected to the Persians as Amyntas married his daughter to a Persian nobleman (Hdt. 5.21.). Under Darius I, Macedonia was organised into a regular tax district of the Empire (Hdt. 6.44.). Their control over Macedonia is attested in the DNA inscription at Naqsh-I-Rustam. Amyntas’ son Alexander I supported Xerxes I during the Persian invasion of Greece. In 479 BC, the Achaemenid forces were defeated by the Greeks, and Macedonia was no longer considered Greek by other city-states.

Another region considered a vassal state rather than a satrap was Arabia. According to Herodotus, they aided Cambyses II in his invasion of Egypt (525 BC). As such, Arabia did not become a satrap and was exempt from paying annual tribute. Instead, they are attested to in the Behistun inscription and in the Persepolis Fortification Tablets as providing 1000 talents per year. In Xerxes’ invasion of Greece, Herodotus mentions the Arabians among the different sections of the Persian Army as being led by Arsamenes – the son of Darius I.

Despite the size of the Achaemenid Empire, there was efficient communication and connectivity between different regions. The Royal Road which ran through most of the empire allowed for the movement and sharing of goods, culture, and ideas between the Achaemenid satraps and vassal states.

=== Ancient China ===
From the time of the Zhou dynasty (1046–770 BC) until the Han dynasty (206 BC – AD 220), a varying number of vassal states existed in Ancient China.

These ranged in size from small city states to vassals which controlled large swathes of territory such as the states of Chu and Qi. One of these vassal states would go on to conquer China and unite the country under the first emperor Qin Shi Huang.

==== Controversy on Status of Joseon ====
The Qing dynasty of China viewed the Joseon dynasty of Korea as an autonomous vassal state. The Joseon dynasty was autonomous in its internal and external affairs. It was not a colony or dependency of China. However, China abandoned its conventional policy of noninterference toward Korea and adopted a radical interventionist one in the late 19th century. Yuan Shikai argued that Korea was a dependent "vassal state"; Owen N. Denny argued that Korea was an independent "tributary state". William W. Rockhill said that calling Korea a vassal state was "misleading". According to Rockhill: "The tribute sent to Peking by all the 'vassal states,' and also by the Tibetans, and the Aboriginal tribes of Western China, is solely a quid pro quo for the privilege of trading with the Chinese under extraordinarily favorable conditions." Rockhill argued that Korea viewed China not as a suzerain but as a family head: Korea likened the Ming dynasty to a father and the Qing dynasty to an older brother. According to Rockhill: "As to the custom of submitting to the Emperor the choice made by the king of an heir to the throne, or of a consort, or informing him of the death of his mother, of his wife, etc., we can look at them as only strictly ceremonial relations, bearing with them no idea of subordination."

=== Ottoman Empire ===
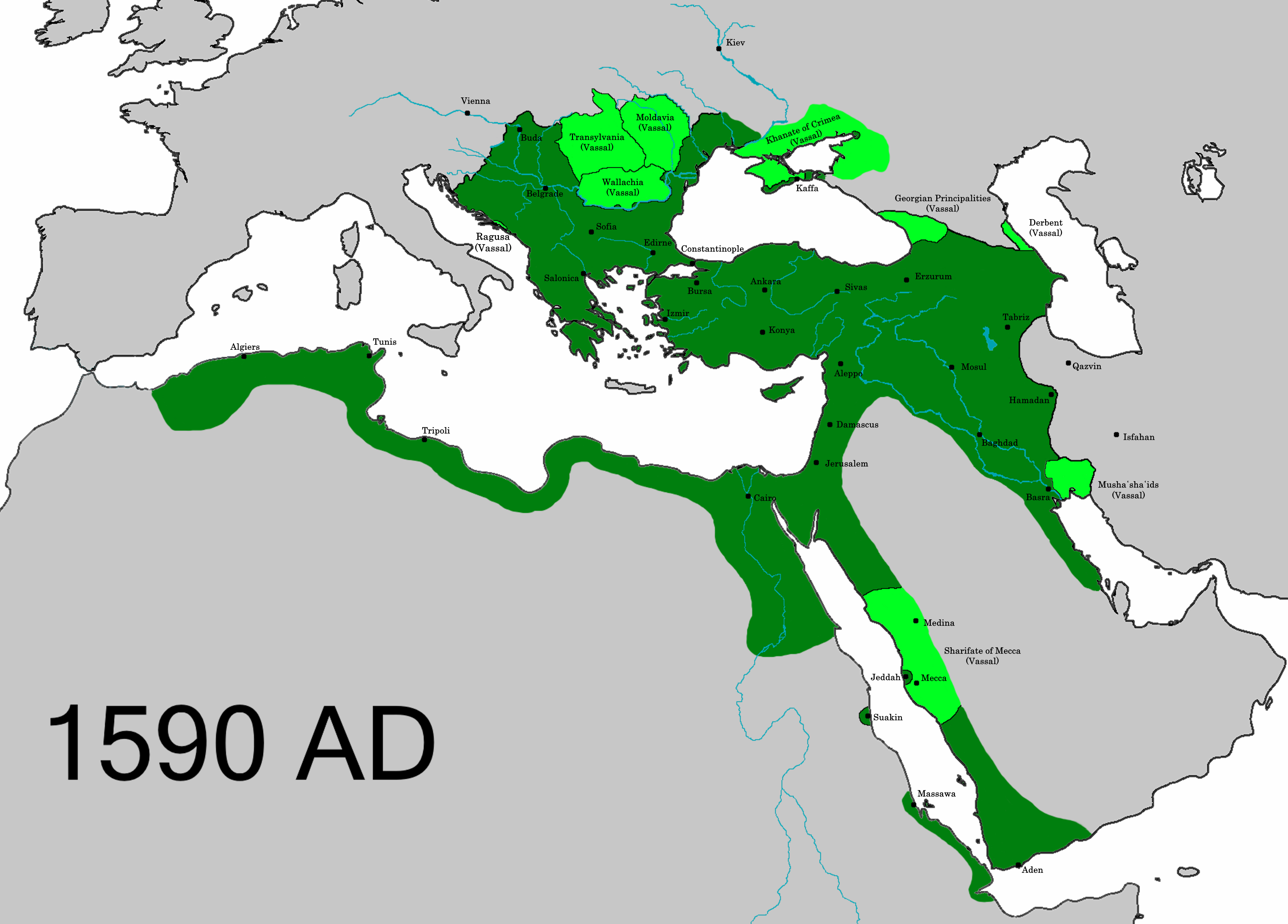
Vassal and tributary states of the Ottoman Empire in 1590

== See also ==
- Autonomous administrative division – Designation for an administrative territorial entity
- Autonomous republic – Type of administrative division similar to a province or state
- Dependent territory – Territory that does not possess full political independence as a sovereign state
- Imperialism – Extension of rule over foreign nations
- Indirect rule – System of governance used by colonial powers
- Non-sovereign monarchy – Type of monarchy
- Periphery countries – Less developed, poorer countries
- Protectorate (imperial China) – Frontier territorial division in imperial China
- Puppet state – State controlled by an external power
- Roman-Persian wars (during which vassal kingdoms played a significant role)
- Tributary state – State in a subordinate relationship to another, more powerful state
- Imperial Estate – Constituent state of the Holy Roman Empire with representation in the Imperial Diet
