= Gobryas (son of Darius I) =

Son of Darius I

Gobryas 𐎥𐎢𐎲𐎽𐎢𐎺 (Gaubaruva)

Dynast of Mariandynia
- Successor: Artabazos I of Phrygia (Note: Erciyas, Wealth, Aristocracy and Royal Propaganda, 12.)
- Born: c. 515 BC
- Died: After 480 BC
- Issue: Ariomandes
- Father: Darius I
- Mother: Artystone

Gobryas (Old Persian: 𐎥𐎢𐎲𐎽𐎢𐎺) was the son of Darius I of Persia and his wife, Artystone. He participated in the Second Persian invasion of Greece (480–479 BC).

Gobryas was born around 515 BC to Darius I and Artystone, one of the king's principal wives and a daughter of Cyrus the Great. Through his parents, he was the great-grandson of the 6th century BC Persian king Arsames on his father's side, and he was also the grandson of Cyrus the Great on his mother's. His full siblings were Arsames and Artazostre.

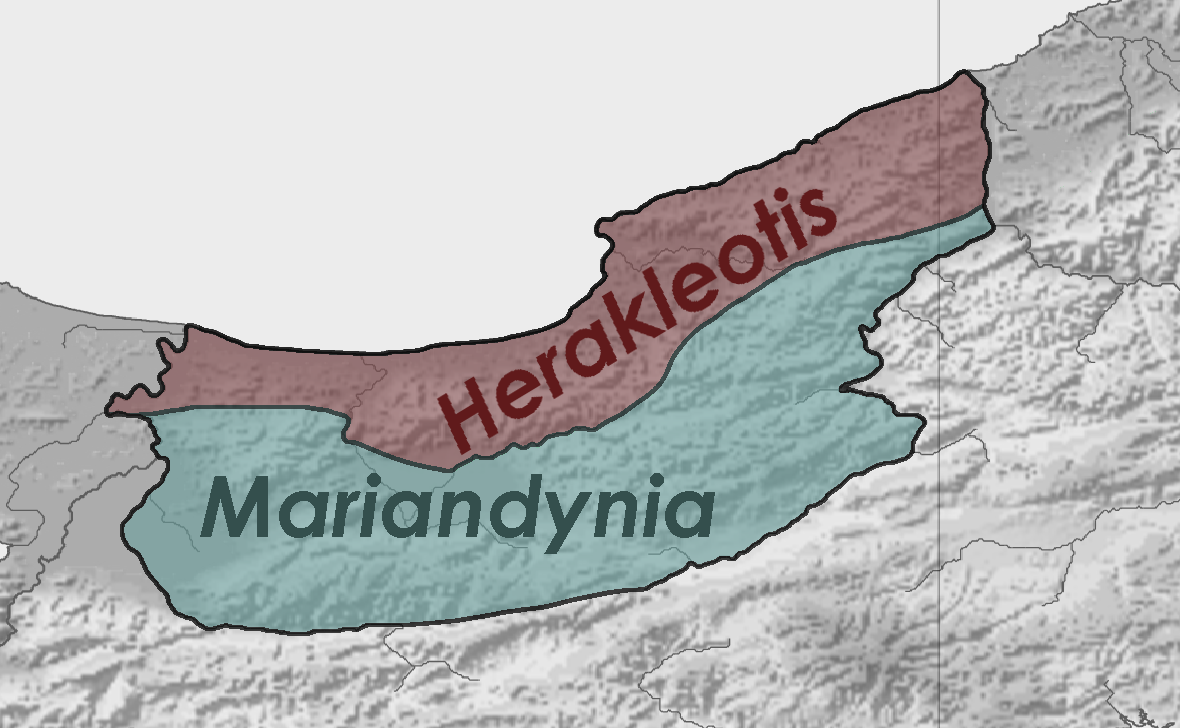
Map of classical Mariandynia with Herakleote territory shaded in red.

Gobryas appears to have received extensive domains in Mariandynia as a gift of his father, and the later tradition suggests rule of Mariandynia constituted a hereditary dunasteia like that of the Hecatomnids over Caria.

During the invasion of Greece, Herodotus records that Gobryas led the contingents of the Mariandynians, Ligyes, and Cappadocians in the expeditionary army of his half-brother Xerxes I. In the Pseudo-Platonic dialogue Axiochus, a Magus named Gobryas tells Socrates that during Xerxes' expedition "his grandfather, who was his namesake," was dispatched to Delos to watch over the island. Plutarch, citing Callisthenes, identifies Ariomandes son of Gobryas as the Persian commander-in-chief at the Battle of the Eurymedon (c. 466 BC). Gobryas disappears from the ancient record after Herodotus 7.72; he may have perished during the Greek campaign.
