= Irdabama =

Early 5th-century BC Persian businesswoman

Irdabama (fl. early 5th-century BC), was an Ancient Persian businesswoman during the reign of Darius the Great (r. 522–485 BC). She is the most well known and wealthiest businesswoman attested to in the records of the Achaemenid Empire at Persepolis. According to Lloyd Llewellyn-Jones (2013), recently uncovered texts in Persepolis indicate that Darius' mother was Irdabama.

It is not clear exactly who Irdabama was, but she was clearly very rich. She has been suggested to be of aristocratic or royal birth. It is also possible that she was in fact two different women. Llewellyn-Jones suggests she descended from a family of Elamite dynasts centered at Susa.

She possessed her own work forces, include 480 laborers, mainly centered in what is today Shiraz. She is the most notable example of Persian women of this era who owned land and estates in Iran as well as outside Iran such as Babylonia, Syria, Egypt, and Media. She mainly dealt in wine and grain and oversaw business holdings, production centers and her estates.

Several seals have been found regarding her business transactions. It is described how she distributed her goods and food rations to her staff and how she supervised the management of her vast land holdings. She travelled widely around Iran and Mesopotamia with her own entourage of servants.
