= Utians =

Ancient Iranic people mentioned in the histories of Herodotus

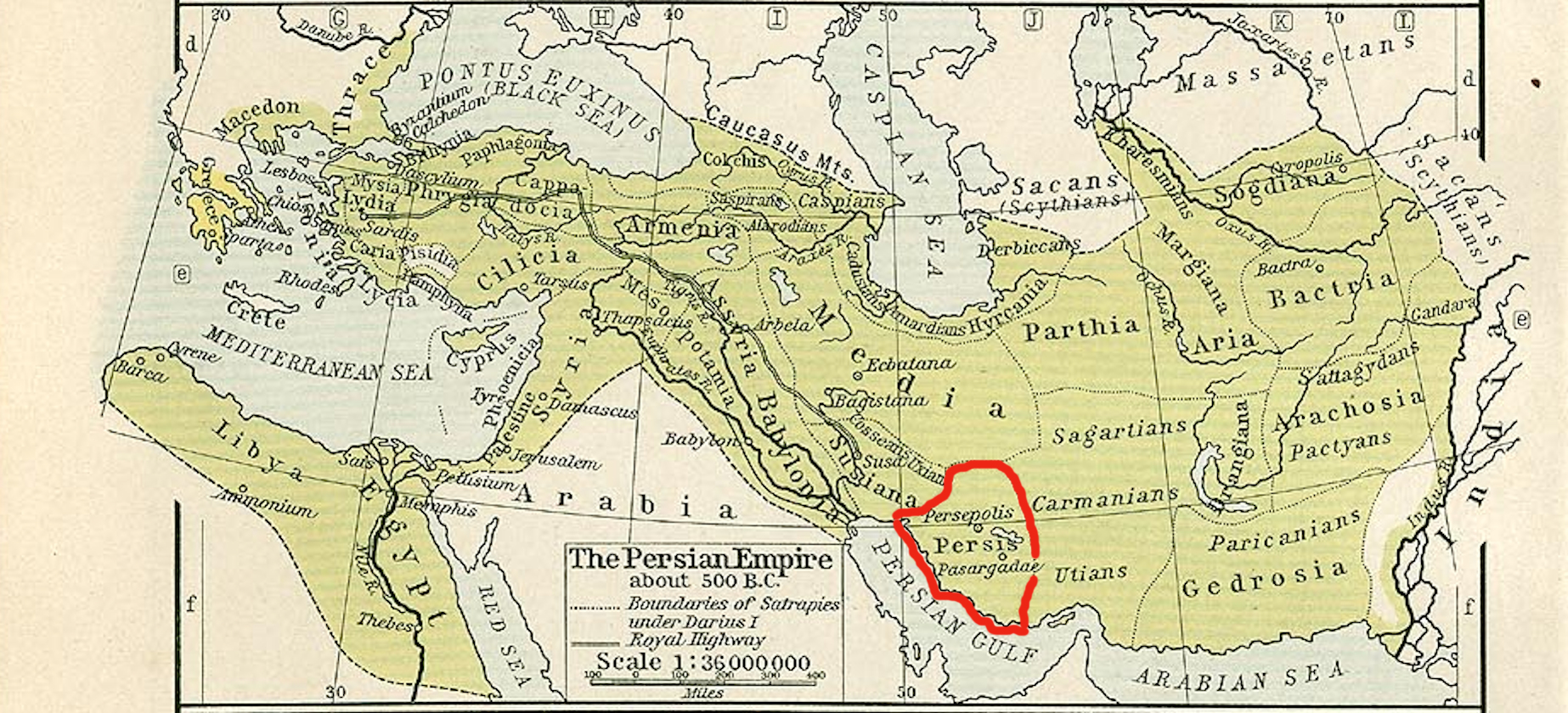
Persian Empire 500 BC Map showing Persis and Utians

The Utians or Utii were ancient western Iranic nomadic camel-driving people, known primarily through the writings of the ancient Greek historian Herodotus. Herodotus describes them as "dressed in skin with the hair on".

There exists little independent record of these people, and it is somewhat unclear to whom Herodotus was referring. He describes them as forming part of the 14th province of the Persian empire, sharing this province with other peoples named Sagartians, Sarangians, Thamanaeans, Mycians, and the unnamed inhabitants of the islands of the Erythraean Sea.

Herodotus also describes them as serving in the army of Xerxes I, under the command of Arsamenes, son of Darius the Great, during the Second Persian invasion of Greece in 481 BCE.

On the Behistun Inscription of Darius the Great, a land in Southern Persis called "Vautiya" or "Yautiya" is described. Some scholars have suggested that might be the same as the homeland of the people Herodotus called "Utians".

A man named Vahyazdāta, residing in a city called Tārvā in a region named Yautiyā in Persia, rose up for a second time in Persia. He told the people: "I am Bardiya, the son of Cyrus." After that, the Persian army at the palace, which had previously come from Anshan, disobeyed me and turned to Vahyazdāta. He became king in Persia.

— Darius the King, Behistun Inscription, 2nd Column, Clause 5

The Utians are generally believed to have ranged over southern Carmania near its border with Gedrosia. Other scholars, notably Josef Markwart, have proposed that Herodotus was confusing his references, and was actually talking about a group of Armenian people from Utik, the Vitii, possibly the ancestors of the Udi people. Still other scholars, such as Amélie Kuhrt, have proposed the Utians are identical to the Uxii.
