= List of revenues of Darius I of Persia =

A List of Revenues of the Darius I, Great King of Persia, is reported by Greek Historian Herodotus c 480 BC. This serves to show the greatness of Darius and the Persian empire, show who was paying tribute to the empire and how much they were capable of paying.

A talent of silver was a considerable sum of money, but making exact conversions to modern currency is problematical at best. Further compounding the problem are differences in how weights were measured.

== Annual tribute (in silver talents) ==
Satrapy	Babylonian Weight	Attic Weight
Ionia (Yauna)	400	520
Lydia (Sparda)	500	650
Phrygia-Cappadocia (Katpatuka)	360	468
Cilicia (Kilikes)	360	468
An Additional 140 Babylonian talents = 182 Attic talents was paid to the garrison of the Gülek Pass(Cilician Gates)
Syria (Abar-Nahara)	350	455
Egypt (Mudraya)	700	910
The Persian garrison in the White Tower at Memphis
was provided with provisions, including 120,000 medimnoi,
which were the annual grain rations for 20,000 men.
In Athenian money of 450 B.C. this represented a market value
of 600,000 drachmae or 100 Attic talents (= 70 Babylonian talents).
Sattagydia-Gandhara	170	222
Susiana (Uvja)	300	390
Babylonia & Assyria	1,000	1,300
Media (Mada)	450	585
Caspia	200	260
Bactria	360	468
Armenia	400	520
Sagartia-Drangiana	250	325
Sacae	600	780
Parthia (Parthava)	300	390
Paricania	400	520
Alordia	200	260
Tibarene	300	390
India (Hindush)	4,680	6,084
Paid in gold dust of 360 Babylonian talents (= 468 Attic talents).|-
At a gold - silver ratio of 1-13 this yields an equivalent
in silver of 4,680 Babylonian talents.
Total	12,280	15,964

== Sources ==
- Herodotus III. 90-96 and cf. A. R. Burn, Persia & the Greeks (New York, 1962), pp. 123–126.
