= Ariomardus =

5th-century BC Persian prince and military leader

Ariomardus was the name of a number of people from classical antiquity:

- A son of the Persian King Darius I and his wife Parmys. He attended Xerxes I into Greece, being in command of the Moschi and Tibareni.
- The brother of Artuphius, who commanded the Caspii in the army of Xerxes I.
- The ruler of Thebes in Egypt, and one of the commanders of the Egyptians in the army of Xerxes.
