= Parmys =

Persian princess

Parmis (Old Persian: (H)uparviyā, Elamite: Uparmiya) was a Persian princess, the only daughter of Bardiya (Smerdis), son of Cyrus the Great.

Once Darius the Great seized the Achaemenid thrones, he married two daughters (Atossa and Artystone) of Cyrus the Great, then later married Parmis. Parmis bore him a son called Ariomardus.

== Sources ==
- Herodotus, III, 88; VII, 78
- Persepolis Fortification Tablets (where she is called Uparmiya)
- Brosius, M: Women in Ancient Persia, 559-331 BC, Clarendon Press, Oxford, 1998.
- Lendering, J: "Parmys ", in http://www.livius.org
- Persepolis Fortification Archive Project
