= Artystone =

Daughter of Cyrus the Great

Artystone (Old Persian: *R̥tastūnā; Ancient Greek: Ἀρτυστώνη Artustṓnē; Elamite Ir-taš-du-na, Ir-da-iš-du-na) also known as Irtašduna in the Fortification tablets, was an Achaemenid princess, daughter of king Cyrus the Great, and sister of Cambyses II, Atossa and Smerdis. Along with Atossa and her niece Parmys, Artystone married king Darius I. It is argued that by marrying the female offspring of Cyrus, the founder of the empire, the new king aimed to prevent his rule from being contested, since Darius himself was not of royal blood.

Artystone and Darius had at least two sons, Arsames and Gobryas, and a daughter, Artazostre. According to the Greek historian Herodotus, Artystone was Darius' favourite wife.

According to James Ussher, Artystone may have been another name for the biblical queen Esther, since Herodotus also called her Artystone the Virgin. While Esther is commonly known as the wife of Xerxes or Artaxerxes, the Book of Esther lists her cousin Mordecai as present during Nebuchadnezzar's capture of Jeconiah in 599 BC, and Josephus referencing him as a contemporary of Darius, making it impossible for Mordecai to be alive during Xerxes' or Artexerxes' reigns.

== Primary sources ==
- Herodotus, 3.88.2 bis; 7.69.2; 7.72.2.
- The Persepolis Fortification Archive
- Annals of the World by James Ussher, 797; 1036
