= Arsamenes =

Ancient Persian prince

Arsamenes (Greek: Ἀρσαμένης) was a prince of ancient Persia, the son of Darius the Great. We know very little about him today other than that he was, according to the historian Herodotus, the commander of the Utians (or "Utii") and Mycae people (or "Myci") in the army of Xerxes I during the Second Persian invasion of Greece.

Herodotus does not mention who Arsamenes's mother was, so we do not know whether Xerxes was his brother or half-brother.
