= Arsames (son of Darius) =

Ancient Persian prince

Arsames (Greek: Ἀρσάμης) or Arsanes was a prince of ancient Persia, the son of Darius the Great and Artystone. Through his parents, he was the great-grandson of the 6th century BCE Persian ruler Arsames on his father's side, and he was also the grandson of Cyrus the Great on his mother's.

He was a commander in the army of his half-brother Xerxes I, leading contingents of Arabian and Ethiopian soldiers during the Second Persian invasion of Greece.

In his play The Persians, the dramatist Aeschylus speaks of an "Arsames", who was the leader of the Egyptians from Memphis in the army of Xerxes.
