= Lloyd Llewellyn-Jones =

Welsh historian

Lloyd Llewellyn-Jones is a Welsh professor of ancient history, with a focus on ancient Iran, in particular the Achaemenid (550–330 BC) period. Before this, he specialized in the study of ancient Greece. Since 2016, he holds the Chair of Ancient History at Cardiff University. Prior to that, he served at the classics department of the University of Edinburgh, where in 2015, he became Professor of Ancient Greek and Iranian Studies.

Llewellyn-Jones is also the director of the Ancient Iran Program at the behest of the British Institute of Persian Studies. He regularly contributes to BBC History, History Today, and World History, among others. Llewellyn-Jones has authored numerous monographs, several books, and has edited and co-edited numerous works.

Since 2025, he has co-hosted, along with biblical scholar Helen Bond, the Biblical Time Machine podcast, which discusses the social and political history of the Bible and other texts related to Judaism and Early Christianity.

== Selected bibliography ==
- Aphrodite's Tortoise: The Veiled Woman of Ancient Greece. Classical Press of Wales, 2003.
- King and Court in Ancient Persia 559 to 331 BCE. Edinburgh University Press, 2013.
- Designs on the Past: How Hollywood Created the Ancient World. Edinburgh University Press, 2018.
- Persians: The Age of the Great Kings. Wildfire Books, 2022.
- Ancient Persia and the Book of Esther: Achaemenid Court Culture in the Hebrew Bible. I.B. Tauris, 2023.
- The Cleopatras: The Forgotten Queens of Egypt. Wildfire Books, 2024.
- Babylon: The Biography of a Metropolis. Pegasus Books, 2026.
