= Artazostre =

Persian princess, daughter of Darius I

Artazostre or Artozostre (Old Persian *Artazauštrī) was a Persian princess, daughter of king Darius the Great (522-485 BC) by Artystone, daughter of Cyrus the Great.

According to the Greek historian Herodotus (VI, 43) Artazostre was given in marriage to Mardonius, young son of the noble Gobryas, not much before he took the command of the Persian army in Thrace and Macedon (c. 493/492 BC).

Artazostre seems not to be mentioned by name in the Persepolis Fortification Tablets (administrative documents found at Persepolis), but there are references (in tablets dated on the year 498 BC) to a "wife of Mardonius, daughter of the king", who received rations for a trip she made with Gobryas and a woman called Radušnamuya or Ardušnamuya, perhaps Gobryas' wife. However, another interpretation of the text suggests that Ardušnamuya was actually the anonymous "wife of Mardonius".

Mardonius had a son, probably by Artazostre, named Artontes.
