= Achaemenid family tree =

The Achaemenid Empire was the first Persian empire, founded in 550 BC by Cyrus the Great, part of the Achaemenid dynasty.

== Family tree ==
Achaemenes King of Persia^{[*]} 705–675
Teispes King of Persia; 675–640
Cyrus I King of Persia; 640–600	Ariaramnes Prince^{[*]}
Cambyses I King of Persia; 600–559	Arukku	Arsames Prince^{[*]}
Cyrus II the Great King of Persia; 559–530/28	Hystaspes Prince^{[*]}	Pharnaces I satrap of Phrygia; Pharnacid dynasty	Megabates military leader
Artystone Princess	Smerdis (Bardiya) Prince (imposter Gaumata ruled as Smerdis^{[*]}); 522	Cambyses II King of Persia; 530–522	Atossa Princess	Darius I the Great King of Persia; 522–486	Artaphernes I general satrap of Lydia	Artabanus counselor	Megabazus general
Parmys	(by daughter of Gobryas); Ariabignes admiral	(by Atossa); Masistes satrap of Bactria	(by Atossa); Xerxes I the Great King of Persia; 485–465	(by Atossa); Achaemenes satrap of Egypt	(by Artystone); Artazostre married Mardonius	(by Parmys); Ariomardus	Artaphernes II general satrap of Lydia	Artyphius commander
Artaynte	Artaxerxes I King of Persia; 465–424	Darius crown prince	Hystaspes satrap of Bactria	Arsames (I) satrap of Egypt	Amytis married Megabyzus
Xerxes II King of Persia; 424	Sogdianus King of Persia; 424–423	Darius II Ochus King of Persia; 423–404	Arsites satrap of Phrygia	Parysatis (I) Princess	Bagapaios Prince
Artaxerxes II Arses King of Persia; 404–358	Amestris Princess	Cyrus the Younger Prince	Ostanes Prince
Darius prince	Artaxerxes III Ochus King of Persia; 358–338	Ariaspes prince	Rodrogune married Orontes I satrap of Sophene & Metiene	Apama married Pharnabazus II satrap of Phrygia	Sisygambis Princess	Arsames (II) Prince
Darius III Artashata King of Persia; 336–330	Oxathres Prince
Artaxerxes IV Arses King of Persia; 338–336	Parysatis (II) Princess	Alexander III the Great King of Macedon and Persia; 329–323	Stateira II Princess	Drypetis married Hephestion general	Amastrine married Craterus general; Dionysius tyrant of Heraclea; Lysimachus king of Thrace

== See also ==
- Template:Cyrus family tree

== Notes ==
*^{1} ^{2} ^{3} ^{4} ^{5} : Unconfirmed rulers, due to the Behistun Inscription.
