= List of Achaemenid emperors =

King of Kings of Achaemenid Empire
- Imperial
- Standard of Cyrus the Great

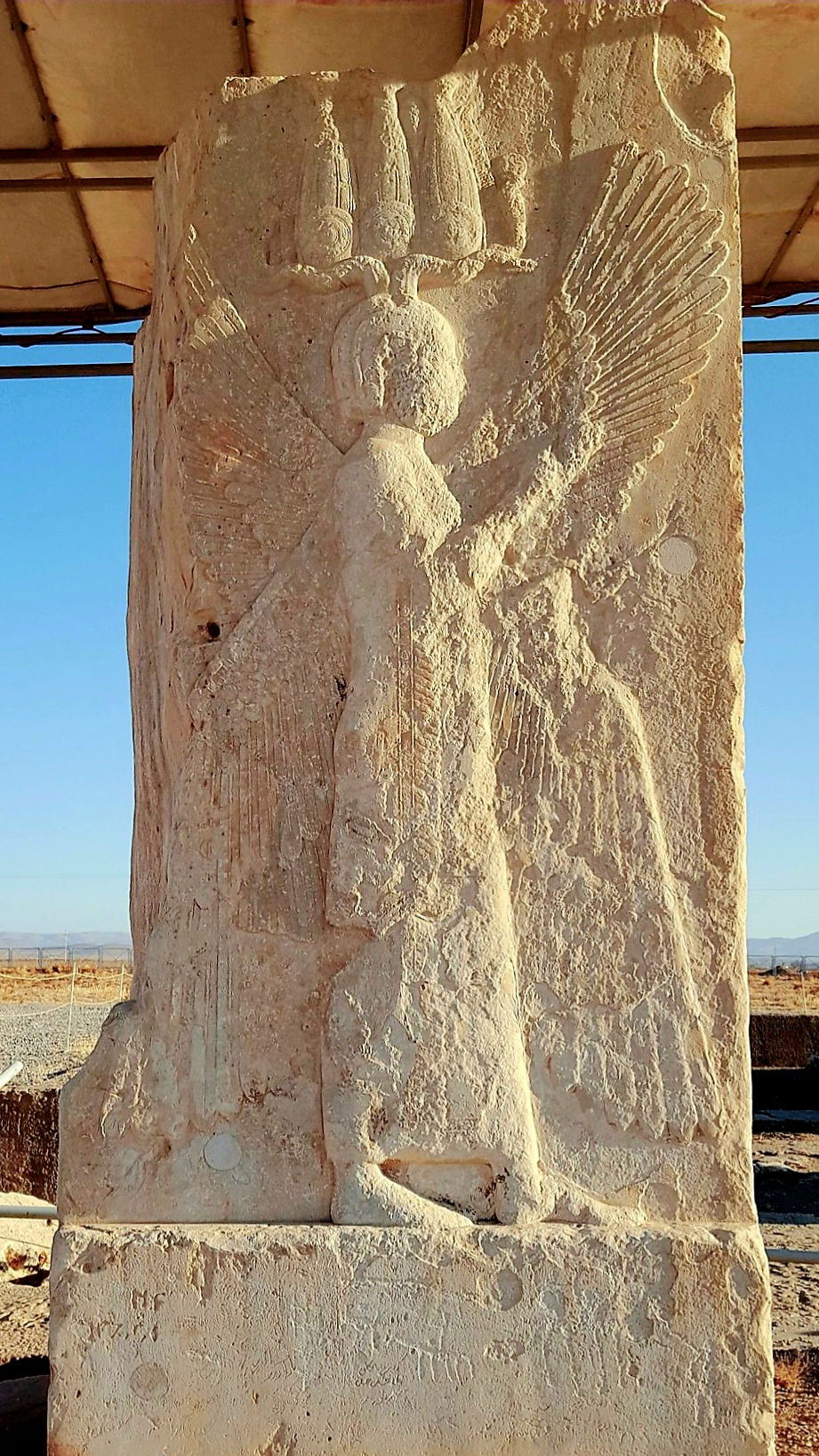
- First to reign Cyrus the Great; 550 BCE – 533 BCE

Details
- Style: Xšāyaθiya Xšāyaθiyānām
- First monarch: Cyrus the Great
- Last monarch: Disputed: Darius III (officially) Artaxerxes V (self-proclaimed)
- Appointer: Hereditary

The Achaemenid Empire or Achaemenian Empire, also known as the Persian Empire or First Persian Empire (/əˈkiːmənɪd/; Old Persian: 𐎧𐏁𐏂 Xšāça, lit. 'The Empire' or 'The Kingdom' ), was an Iranian empire founded by Cyrus the Great of the Achaemenid dynasty in 550 BC. Based in modern-day Iran, it was the largest empire by that point in history, spanning a total of 5.5 million square kilometres (2.1 million square miles). The empire spanned from the Balkans and Egypt in the west, to the Indus Valley in the east.

Around the 7th century BC, the region of Persis in the southwestern portion of the Iranian plateau was settled by the Persians. Cyrus conquered the Medes as well as Lydia and the Neo-Babylonian Empire, marking the establishment of a new imperial polity under the Achaemenid dynasty.

In the modern era, the Achaemenid Empire has been recognized for its imposition of a successful model of centralized bureaucratic administration, its policy of tolerance, building complex infrastructure such as road systems and an organized postal system, the use of official languages across its territories, and the development of civil services, including a large, professional army. Its advancements inspired the implementation of similar styles of governance by a variety of later empires.

== Pre-Imperial Kings ==
Achaemenes	First ruler of the Achaemenid kingdom and founder of the dynasty. Attested to only by the Behistun Inscription.	705 BC
Teispes	Son of Achaemenes. Attested to only by the Behistun Inscription.	640 BC
Cyrus I	Son of Teispes, first Achaemenid ruler with attestation.	580 BC
Cambyses I	Son of Cyrus I and father of Cyrus II. No records from his reign survive.	550 BC

== List of Emperors ==
Name	Image	Comments	Dates
Cyrus II		Transformed the dynasty into an empire, conquering Babylon and Lydia; King of the "four corners of the world".	560–530 BC
Cambyses II		King of Persia in addition to Pharaoh of Egypt	530–522 BC
Gaumata		King of Persia, allegedly an impostor named Gaumata.	522 BC
Darius I		King of Persia in addition to Pharaoh of Egypt. Allegedly cousin of Cambyses II and Bardiya.	522–486 BC
Xerxes I		King of Persia in addition to Pharaoh of Egypt	486–465 BC
Artaxerxes I		King of Persia in addition to Pharaoh of Egypt	465–424 BC
Xerxes II		King of Persia in addition to Pharaoh of Egypt. Assassinated by his half-brother and successor, Sogdianus.	424 BC (45 days)
Sogdianus		King of Persia in addition to Pharaoh of Egypt	424–423 BC
Darius II		King of Persia in addition to Pharaoh of Egypt. His birth name was Ochus.	423–405 BC
Artaxerxes II		King of Persia. Ruling for 47 years, Artaxerxes II was the longest reigning Achaemenid king. His birth name was Arses.	405–358 BC
Artaxerxes III		King of Persia in addition to Pharaoh of Egypt, having re-conquered the land after it was lost during the reign of Artaxerxes II. His birth name was Ochus.	358–338 BC
Artaxerxes IV		King of Persia in addition to Pharaoh of Egypt. His birth name was Arses.	338–336 BC
Darius III		King of Persia in addition to Pharaoh of Egypt; last ruler of the empire. His birth name was either Artashata or Codomannus.	336–330 BC

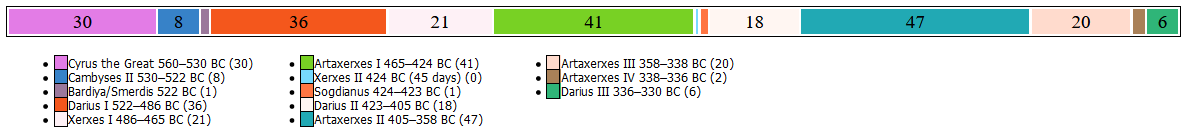
== Sources ==
- Brosius, Maria (2021). A History of Ancient Persia: The Achaemenid Empire. Wiley-Blackwell. ISBN 978-1-444-35092-0.
- Lavan, Myles; Payne, Richard E.; Weisweiler, John, eds. (2016). "Cosmopolitan Politics: The Assimilation and Subordination of Elite Cultures". Cosmopolitanism and Empire: Universal Rulers, Local Elites, and Cultural Integration in the Ancient Near East and Mediterranean. Oxford University Press.
