= List of rulers of the pre-Achaemenid kingdoms of Iran =

== Elam, c. 2700 – 519 BCE ==
The Elamites settlement was in southwestern Iran, where is modern Khuzestan, Ilam, Fars, Bushehr, Lorestan, Bakhtiari and Kohgiluyeh provinces. Their language was neither Semitic nor Indo-European, and they were the geographic ancestors of the Achaemenid/Persian empire. For a full list of Elamite major and minor kings see:

- List of rulers of Elam

== Western Kingdoms, c. 2550 – c. 700 BCE ==
=== Marhasi kingdom, c. 2550–c. 1900 BCE ===
Some scholars suggested that Marhasi were located in southeastern Iran.

1. Migirenlil (c. 2550 BCE)
2. Unnamed King (c. 2325 BCE)
3. Abalgamash (c. 2316 – 2312 BCE), revolted against Rimush of Akkad
4. Hubshumkibi (c. 2270 BCE contemporary with Naram-Sin king of Akkad)
5. Unnamed King (c. 2080 BCE)
6. Hashibatal (c. 2070 BCE contemporary with Shulgi king of Ur)
7. Arvilukpi (c. 2050 BCE contemporary with Amar-Sin king of Ur)
8. Pariashum (c. 2045 BCE contemporary with Amar-Sin king of Ur)
9. Libanugshabash (2044–c. 2033 BCE)
10. Mashhundahli (c. 2020 BCE contemporary with Ibbi-Sin king of Ur)

=== Namar kingdom, c. 24th century–c. 750 BCE ===
1. Tishari (c. 2350 BCE)
2. Inbir (c. 2290 BCE)
3. Sadarmat (c. 2270 BCE)
4. Arisen (c. 2260 BCE)
5. Unknown Queen (c. 1764 BCE)
6. Karziyabku (c. 1200 BCE)
7. Ritti-Marduk (c. 1110 BCE)
8. Marduk-Mudammiq (until 844/2 BCE)
9. Ianzu (844/2–835/4 BCE)

=== Zakhara kingdom, c. 2350–c. 2250 BCE ===
Sources:

1. The unnamed prince of Zakhara (c. 2315 BCE)
2. Ungapi (c. 2315 BCE). Regent of Zakhara
3. The unnamed king of Zakhara (after 2254 BCE)

=== Ganhar kingdom, c. 21st century BCE ===
1. Kisari (c. 2071–c. 2050 BCE)
2. Warad-Nannar (c. 2035 BCE)

== Northwestern Kingdoms, c. 2400 – 521 BCE ==
=== Lullubi kingdom, c. 2400–c. 650 BCE ===
Sources:

1. Immashkush (c. 2400 BCE)
2. Anubanini (c. 2350 BCE) he ordered to make an inscription on the rock near Sar-e Pol-e Zahab
3. Satuni (c. 2270 BCE contemporary with Naram-Sin king of Akkad and Khita king of Awan)
4. Irib (c. 2037 BCE)
5. Darianam (c. 2000 BCE)
6. Ikki (precise dates unknown)
7. Tar ... duni (precise dates unknown) son of Ikki. his inscription is found near the inscription of Anubanini
8. Nur-Adad (c. 881 – 880 BCE)
9. Zabini (c. 881 BCE)
10. Hubaia (c. 830 BCE) vassal of Assyrians
11. Dada (c. 715 BCE)
12. Larkutla (c. 675 BCE)

=== Gilzan kingdom, c. 900–c. 820 BCE ===
1. Unknown king (c. 883–c. 880 BCE)
2. Asau (c. mid-9th century BCE)
3. Upu (c. 827 BCE)

=== Ida kingdom, c. 860–c. 710 BCE ===
1. Nikdiara (c. 856/5–c. 827 BCE)
2. Sharsina (c. 821–c. 820 BCE)
3. Parnua (c. 713 BCE)

=== Allabria, c. 850–c. 710 BCE ===
1. Ianziburiash (c. 842 BCE)
2. Artasari (c. 829 BCE)
3. Bēl-apla-iddina (until 716 BCE)
4. Itti (c. 711 BCE)

=== Gizilbunda kingdom, c. 850–c. 700 BCE ===
1. Pirishati (until 820 BCE) (in Urash)
2. Titamashka (c. 820 BCE) (in Sasiashu)
3. Kiara (c. 820 BCE) (in Kar-Sibutu)
4. Engur (c. 820 BCE) (in Sibaru)
5. Zizi (c. 714 BCE) (in Appatar)
6. Zala (c. 714 BCE) (in Kit-Patia)

=== Araziash kingdom, c. 850 – 716 BCE ===
1. Barua (precise dates unknown)
2. Munsuarta (c. 820 BCE)
3. Unknown king (c. 775–c. 772 BCE)
4. Ramatea (c. 744 BCE)
5. Satareshu (c. 713 BCE)

=== Andia Kingdom, c. 850–c. 700 BCE ===
Sources:

1. Unnamed king of Andia (c. 827 BCE) contemporary with Daian-Ashur military leader of Assyrian empire in western Iran
2. Telusina (c. 719 – 715 BCE) who revolted against king of Manna and was defeated by Sargon II king of Assyria

=== Zikartu kingdom, c. 750 – 521 BCE ===
1. The unnamed king of Zikartu (c. 744 BCE)
2. Mettati (c. 719 – 714 BCE)
3. Bagparna (from 714 BCE)
4. Tritantaechmes (until July 15, 521 BCE)

=== Median dynasty, 726–521 BCE ===
The Medes were an Iranian people. The Persians, a closely related and subject people, revolted against the Median empire during the 6th century BCE.

Throne Name		Original Name	Portrait	Title	Born-Died	Entered office	Left office	Family Relations	Note
Median dynasty, 726–521 BCE
1	Deioces	Dahyuka			? – 674 BCE	726 BCE	674 BCE	son of Phraortes	Deposed by Assyrians
2	Phraortes	Fravartiš			? – 652 BCE	674 BCE	652 BCE	son of Deioces	Killed in battle with Assyrians and Scythians. Domination of Scythian kingdom 652–625 BCE
3	Cyaxares	Huvaxšaθra			? – 585 BCE	625 BCE	585 BCE	son of Phraortes	Allied with Nabopolassar of Babylon and destroyed Assyria
4	Astyages	Arštivaigah			? – 585 BCE	585 BCE	550 BCE	son of Cyaxares	Deposed and later killed
5	Cyaxares II	Huvaxšaθra			? – May 521 BCE	December 522 BCE	May 8, 521 BCE	descendant of Cyaxares	Killed by Darius I

=== Saparda kingdom, c. 720–c. 670 BCE ===
1. Dusanni (r. c. 670 BCE)

=== Scythian kingdom of Iškuza, c. 700–c. 530 BCE ===
1. Išpakaia (unknown – c. 679 BCE)
2. Bartatua (c. 679 BCE – c. 658/9 BCE), possible son of Išpakaia
3. Madyes (c. 658/9 BCE – 625 BCE), son of Bartatua

== Southern Kingdoms, c. 710–550 BCE ==
=== Achaemenid Kings of Parsumash, c. 710–c. 635 BCE ===
1. Achaemenes, founder of the dynasty.
2. Teispes (I) son of Achaemenes c. 710–c. 685 BCE
3. Cambyses (I) son of Teispes (I) c. 685–c. 660 BCE
4. Cyrus (I) son of Cambyses (I) c. 660–c. 635 BCE

=== Achaemenid Kings of Anshan, c. 635 – 550 BCE ===
1. Teispes of Anshan, or Teispes (II) son of Achaemenes or Cyrus (I), king of Persia, king of Anshan, c. 635–c. 610 BCE
2. Cyrus I of Anshan or Cyrus (II), son of Teispes (II), king of Anshan c. 610–c. 585 BCE
3. Cambyses I of Anshan or Cambyses (II), his son, king of Anshan c. 585 – 559 BCE
4. Cyrus II the Great or Cyrus (III), his son, king of Anshan 559–529. He conquered the Median Empire in 550 and established the Persian Empire.
- Line of Ariaramnes
1. Ariaramnes of Persia, son of Teispes (II), king of Persia. His reign is doubtful.
2. Arsames of Persia, son of Ariaramnes, king of Persia until 550, died after 520. His reign is doubtful.
3. His son Hystaspes was Satrap of Parthia under Cambyses II, Smerdis and his son Darius.

== Bibliography ==
- Cameron, George, "History of Early Iran", Chicago, 1936 (repr., Chicago, 1969; tr. E.-J. Levin, L’histoire de l’Iran antique, Paris, 1937; tr. H. Anusheh, ایران در سپیده دم تاریخ, Tehran, 1993)
- D’yakonov, I. M., "Istoriya Midii ot drevenĭshikh vremen do kontsa IV beka de e.E" (The history of Media from ancient times to the end of the 4th century BCE), Moscow and Leningrad, 1956; tr. Karim Kešāvarz as Tāriḵ-e Mād, Tehran, 1966.
- Hinz, W., "The Lost World of Elam", London, 1972 (tr. F. Firuznia, دنیای گمشده ایلام, Tehran, 1992)
- Legrain, Leon, "Historical Fragments", Philadelphia, The University of Pennsylvania Museum Publications of the Babylonian Section, vol. XIII, 1922.
- Majidzadeh, Yusef, "History and civilization of Elam", Tehran, Iran University Press, 1991.
- Majidzadeh, Yusef, "History and civilization of Mesopotamia", Tehran, Iran University Press, 1997, vol.1.
- Potts, D. T., The Archaeology of Elam, Cambridge University Press, 1999.
- Qashqai, Hamidreza, Chronicle of early Iran history, Tehran, Avegan press, 2011 (in Persian: گاهنمای سپیده دم تاریخ در ایران )
- Boardman, John; Edwards, I. E. S.; Sollberger, E.; Hammond, N. G. L., eds. (1992). The Cambridge Ancient History, Volume III, Part 2: The Assyrian and Babylonian Empires and other States of the Near East, from the Eighth to the Sixth Centuries B.C. Cambridge: Cambridge University Press. ISBN 978-0-5212-2717-9.
- Gershevitch, Ilya, ed. (1985). The Cambridge History of Iran: The Median and Achaemenian Periods. Vol. 2. Cambridge: Cambridge University Press. ISBN 0-521-20091-1.
- Vallat, Francois. Elam: The History of Elam. Encyclopaedia Iranica, vol. VIII pp. 301-313. London/New York, 1998.
