= Cambyses I =

King of Persia from c. 580 to 559 BC

Cambyses
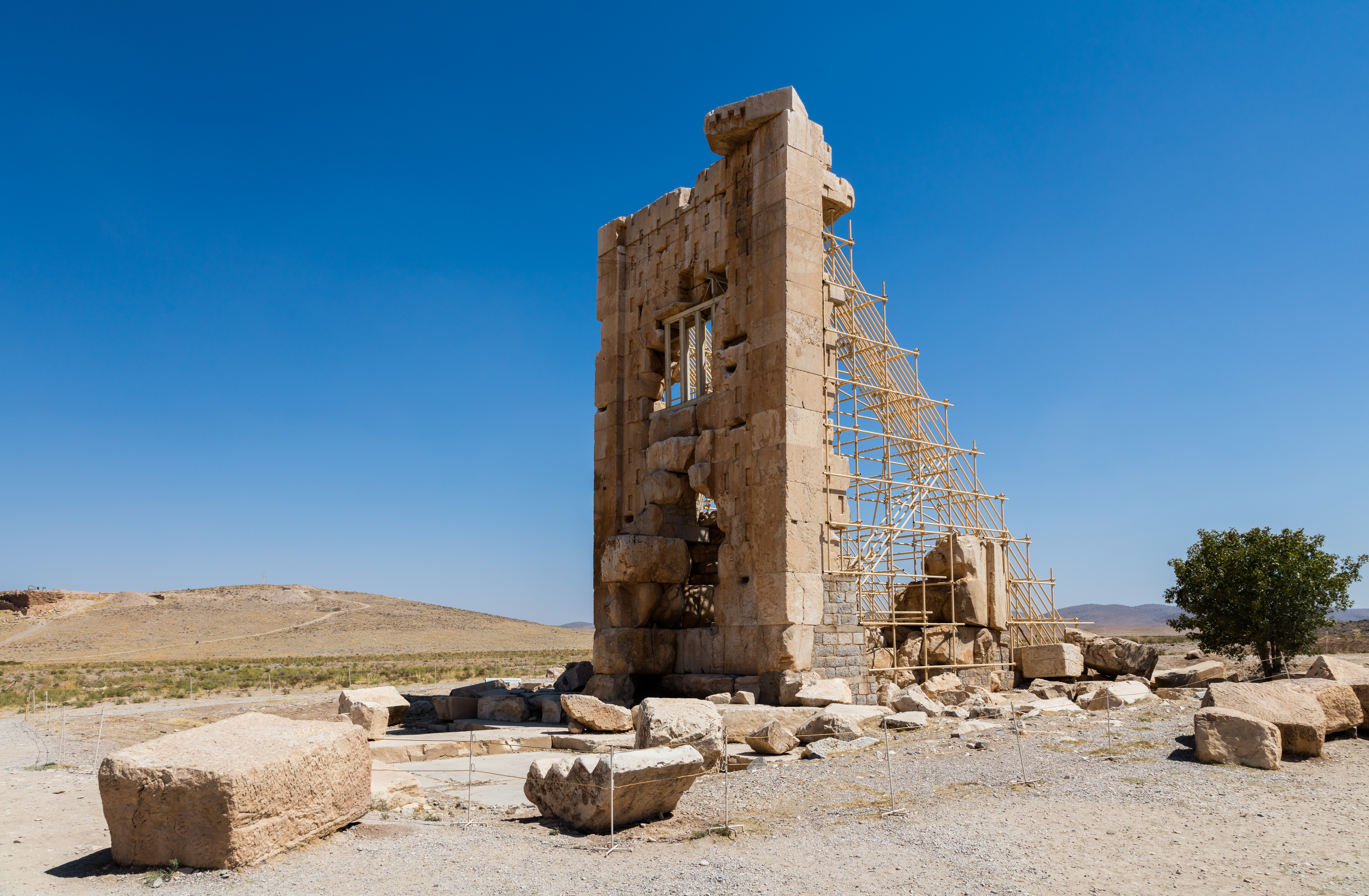
- Tomb of Cambyses I, Pasargadae

King of Persia
- Reign: 580–559 BC
- Predecessor: Cyrus I
- Successor: Cyrus II
- Died: 559 BC (aged 41); Pasargadae
- Burial: 559; Pasargadae
- Consort: Mandane of Media
- Issue: Cyrus the Great
- Dynasty: Achaemenid (Teispid)
- Father: Cyrus I
- Religion: Ancient Iranian religion

Cambyses I (Old Persian: 𐎣𐎲𐎢𐎪𐎡𐎹 Kambūjiya) was king of Anshan from c. 580 to 559 BC and the father of Cyrus the Great (Cyrus II), younger son of Cyrus I, and brother of Arukku. He should not be confused with his better-known grandson Cambyses II.

== Etymology ==
The origins of the name of "Cambyses" (Old Persian: 𐎣𐎲𐎢𐎪𐎡𐎹, romanized: Kaᵐbūjiya) is disputed in scholarship; according to some scholars, the name is of Elamite origin, whilst others associate it with Kambojas, an Iranian people who inhabited northwestern India. The name of Cambyses is known in other languages as: Elamite Kanbuziya; Akkadian Kambuziya; Aramaic Kanbūzī.

== Background ==
No records composed during Cambyses' lifetime have survived. Cambyses was an early member of the Achaemenid dynasty. He was apparently a great-grandson of its founder Achaemenes, grandson of Teispes and son of Cyrus I. His paternal uncle was Ariaramnes and his first cousin was Arsames.

However, around 100 years later, Herodotus claimed that Cambyses I was a vassal of the Median king Astyages and, he solidified his political standing through marriage to one of Astyages' daughters, whose name wasn't explicitly said by Herodotus. This alliance likely helped in securing the support or neutrality of Media as his son, Cyrus, began his military campaigns that eventually led to the founding of the Persian Empire. His role was essential in the transition from a minor regional rule in Anshan to the larger ambitions of the Achaemenid dynasty that dominated much of the ancient Near East.

== Personal life ==
According to Herodotus, Cambyses was "a man of good family and quiet habits". He reigned under the overlordship of Astyages, King of Media. He was reportedly married to Princess Mandane of Media, a daughter of Astyages and Princess Aryenis of Lydia. His wife was reportedly a granddaughter of both Cyaxares of Media and Alyattes of Lydia. The result of their marriage was the birth of his successor Cyrus the Great. According to Nicolas of Damascus, his original name was Atradates, and he was wounded and later died in the Battle of the Persian Border which he, with his son, fought against Astyages. It occurred in about 551 BC, and he is reported to have received an honorable burial.

Also according to Herodotus, Astyages chose Cambyses as a son-in-law because he considered him to pose no threat to the Median throne, having dreamt his daughter would give birth to one who would rule Asia, overthrowing Astyages. This was not quite the case with Cyrus the Great who would go on to depose his grandfather, and to begin the Persian Empire.

== Sources ==
- Briant, Pierre (2002). From Cyrus to Alexander: A History of the Persian Empire. Eisenbrauns. ISBN 978-1575060316.
- Dandamayev, Muhammad A. (1990). "Cambyses". Encyclopaedia Iranica, Vol. IV, Fasc. 7. pp. 726–729.

Cambyses I Achaemenid dynasty Born: Unknown Died: 559 BC
Preceded by Cyrus I	King of Anshan; 580–559 BC	Succeeded by Cyrus the Great
