= Mandane of Media =

Wife of Cambyses I

Mandane
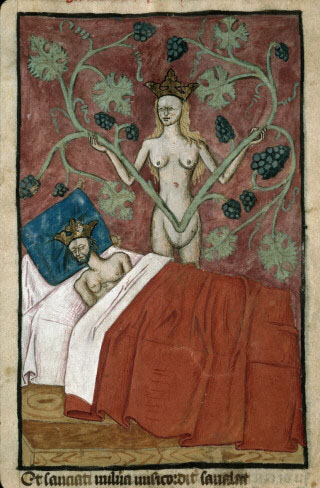
- Astyages' dream
- Born: c. 600BC; Media
- Died: 559 BC ? Persis
- Burial: Gur-e-Dokhtar (?)
- Spouse: Cambyses I
- Issue: Cyrus the Great
- House: Achaemenid
- Father: Astyages
- Mother: Aryenis (?)
- Religion: Indo-Iranian religion

Mandane (Greek: Μανδάνη, Mandánē) was a Median princess and, later, the queen consort of the Persian king Cambyses I and the mother of Cyrus the Great, the founder of the Achaemenid Empire. The name likely originates from the Old Iranian *Mandanā-, which means “delighting, cheerful”.

Mandane was the daughter of Astyages, but the name of her mother is not mentioned. It is said that Astyages married Aryenis in 585 BC, but it is unlikely that Aryenis was the mother of Mandane. She possibly was the daughter of a previous wife of Astyages. According to the Greek historian Herodotus, Astyages had a dream in which his daughter stood before him, and suddenly a vine began to grow from her back, extending its tendrils to cover all of Asia. He called upon the Magi and priests to interpret the dream, and they explained that the vine represented his grandson, the son of Mandane, who would take his place on the throne and rule over all of Asia. In 577 BC, when Mandane reached marriageable age, Astyages gave her in marriage to Cambyses I, a Persian with noble ancestry who was mild-mannered and held a lower position than the Medes. Therefore, he did not believe that Cambyses I would pose a threat to his kingdom. Mandane's marriage to Cambyses was encouraged by Astyages to strengthen the bonds between the Medes and Persians.

Mandane gave birth to a son named Cyrus, whom Astyages ordered to be executed by Harpagus. However, Harpagus handed the child over to a shepherd and lied to Astyages, saying that Cyrus had been killed. When Cyrus grew up, his grandfather Astyages discovered that he was alive and allowed him to return to his parents in Persia. Xenophon also mentions Mandane in his work Cyropaedia. According to his story, Mandane and her son traveled to the court of Astyages, where the adolescent Cyrus surprised his grandfather, who decided to keep him at the court. Mandane, however, returned to her husband Cambyses I in Persia. After several years, Cyrus asked Astyages to let him return to Persia, but some time after his departure from Ecbatana, the Persian Revolt began. Astyages' dreams and their interpretation became reality when Cyrus led the revolt that resulted in the overthrow of Astyages from the throne, the fall of the Median kingdom, and the rise of the Achaemenid Empire.

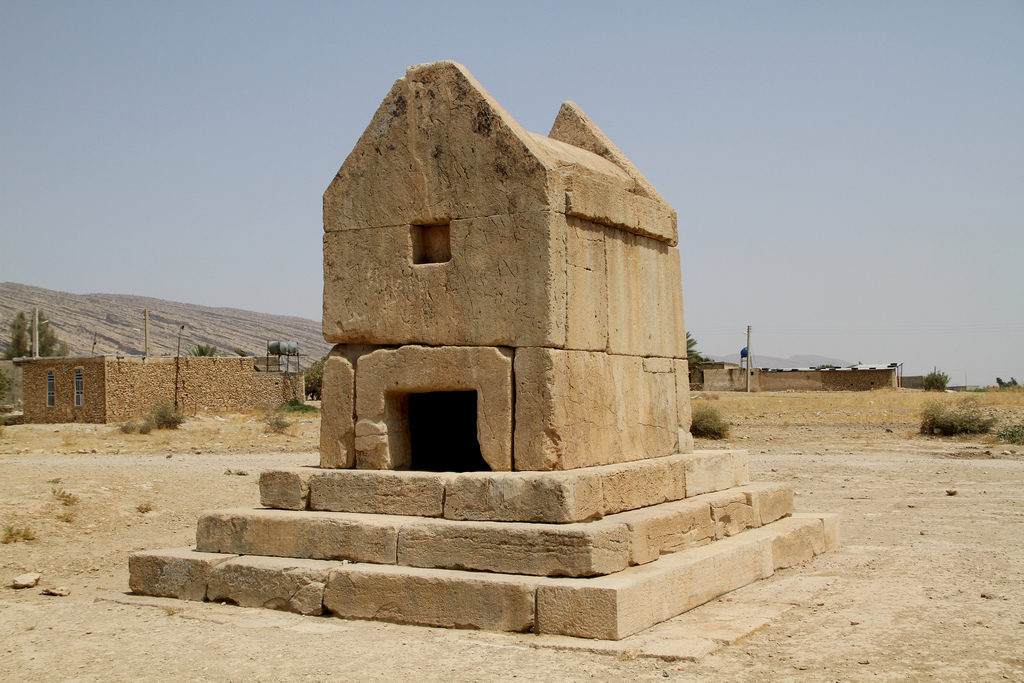
Gur-e Dokhtar, supposed tomb of Mandane

Mandane serves as the genealogical link connecting the kings of the Achaemenid dynasty with the ancient Median royal family. Some scholars have suggested that the Gur-e Dokhtar tomb, discovered in 1960, could be the burial site of Mandane. However, other scholars believe that the tomb might belong to Atossa, Teispes, or Cyrus I.

There is some doubt about the historical accuracy of the marriage between Cambyses and Mandane. The Median mother of Cyrus may have been invented to justify the later Persian rule over the Medes. It appears that the purpose of this story is to establish a direct relationship between Astyages and Cyrus, that is, between Media and Persia. Due to the historical record of the battle between Astyages and Cyrus and the conquest of Media by Cyrus as reported in the Nabonidus Chronicle, the story of the marriage between Cambyses I and Mandane, as well as the birth of Cyrus from this couple, is highly questionable in terms of its historicity. There is also the account by Ctesias, which claims that Cyrus married a daughter of Astyages named Amytis. If both the accounts of Ctesias and Herodotus are correct, then Cyrus marrying Amytis would be an unusual case of incest, as he would be marrying his aunt. Nevertheless, Herodotus' account is considered reliable by most modern scholars, such as George G. Cameron.
