= Teispids =

Ancient Persian dynasty descended from Teispes

The Teispids (descendants of Teispes) (c. mid-7th century BC–522 BC) were an Iron Age branch of the Achaemenid dynasty originally ruling the southern Zagros, in ancient Anshan. The dynasty's realm was later expanded under Cyrus II, who conquered a vast area in southwestern Asia, founding what was later known as the Achaemenid Empire under Darius I. The titulary of the Teispids is recorded on the Cyrus Cylinder, in which Cyrus II identifies himself and his ancestors with the title King of Anshan, as an Elamite tradition. Teispes being the eponymous ancestor and founder, the dynasty furthermore included Cyrus I, Cambyses I, Cyrus II, Cambyses II and Bardiya.

Anshan was part of the Elamite Kingdom during the second millennium BC. During the Neo-Elamite Period, the Elamite Kingdom weakened and Anshan became less reliant on the kingdom, with the Neo-Elamite kings unable to assert their authority over Anshan, and a large number of Iranians moved into the region. In 646 BC, the Elamite capital city of Susa was sacked by the Neo-Assyrian Empire and the Elamite Kingdom disappeared. At some time in the seventh century BC, Anshan became its own independent kingdom under Teispes. Pierre Briant places the formation of the kingdom of Anshan in this context, and dates Teispes' ascension to kingship c. 635 BC.

The Cyrus Cylinder, a Babylonian text, contains the oldest genealogy of the Kings of Anshan. It establishes the line of kings up to Cyrus the Great as Teispes–Cyrus I–Cambyses I–Cyrus II, and establishes that their entire domain before Cyrus the Great was Anshan, now identified as the plain near Marvdasht in Fars province. No mention is made of Achaemenes, who according to a later genealogy provided by Darius the Great in the Behistun Inscription was the father of Teispes and the first King of Anshan.

The Teispid line was succeeded by the Achaemenids with Darius I seizing the throne, after killing the last members of the Teispids. According to Maria Brosius and Bruce Lincoln, Darius attempted to construct a lineage through common ancestry to the Teispid kings to legitimate his claim to the throne. To do so, he created the impression that they were Achaemenids. He did so by means of inscriptions. He presented Cyrus II as a member of the Achaemenids, in the Pasargadae inscriptions (CMa). All of these inscriptions, which date back to c. 510 BC, repeat "I am Cyrus the King, an Achaemenian". In the Behistun Inscription, Darius created the image of a double line of royal rulers through a common ancestor named Teispes, and a putative eponymous ancestor Achaemenes.
