= Hakhamanishi =

Hakhamanishi (Persian: هخامنشی, lit. 'Achaemenid', from Old Persian 𐏃𐎧𐎠𐎶𐎴𐎡𐏁 Hakhāmanish “Achaemenes”) or Hakhamaneshi (Iranian Persian pronunciation) may refer to:

- the Achaemenid Empire
- the Achaemenid dynasty
- a surname, notably borne by
  - Vafa Hakhamaneshi (born 1991), Iranian professional footballer
