= Gur-e-Dokhtar =

Ancient tomb in Iran

Gur-e Dokhtar گور دختر (in Persian)
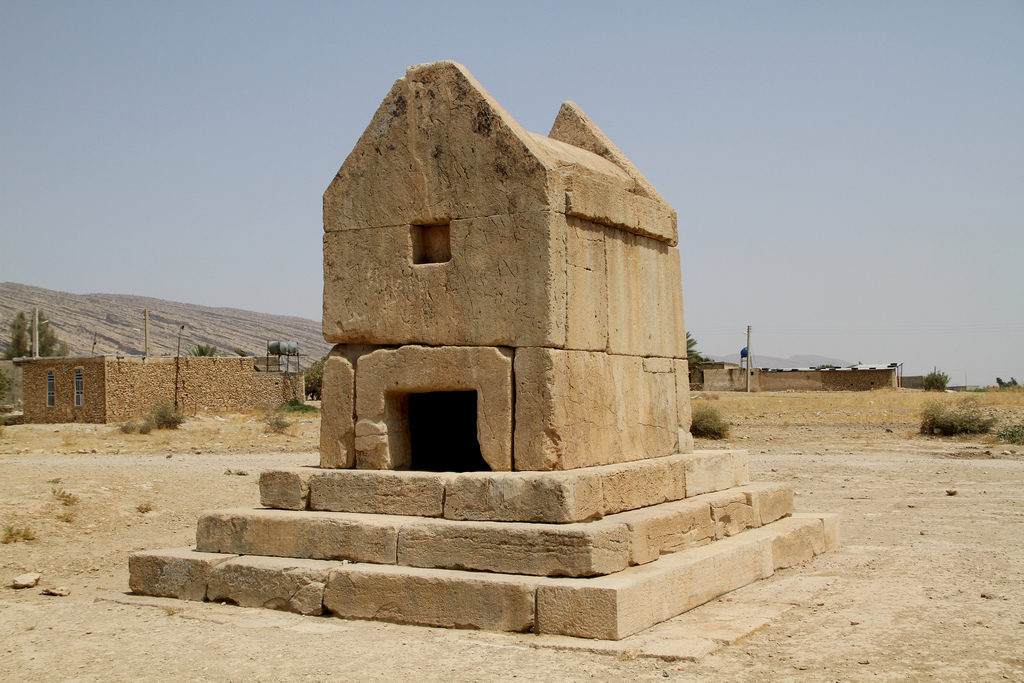
- Gur-e Dokhtar

- Location within Iran
- Location: Dashtestan County, Iran

History
- Built: 6th century BC

Site notes
- Architectural styles: Persian architecture Achaemenid architecture

Gur-e-Dokhtar
- Location in Iran
- Coordinates: 29°13′01″N 51°39′04″E

Gur-e Dokhtar (Persian: گور دختر) is an ancient tomb located in the province of Bushehr in Iran. The tomb likely dates to the 5th century BC and has great similarities to Cyrus II's tomb in Pasargadae, but is smaller. It has been argued to be the tomb of either Cyrus the Great's grandfather, Cyrus I, or his later descendant Cyrus the Younger.

== See also ==
- Tomb of Cyrus
- Cyrus the Younger
- Teispes
- Cyrus I
- Atossa
- Mandane of Media
