= Military of the Achaemenid Empire =

Military apparatus of Iran from 550 to 330 BC

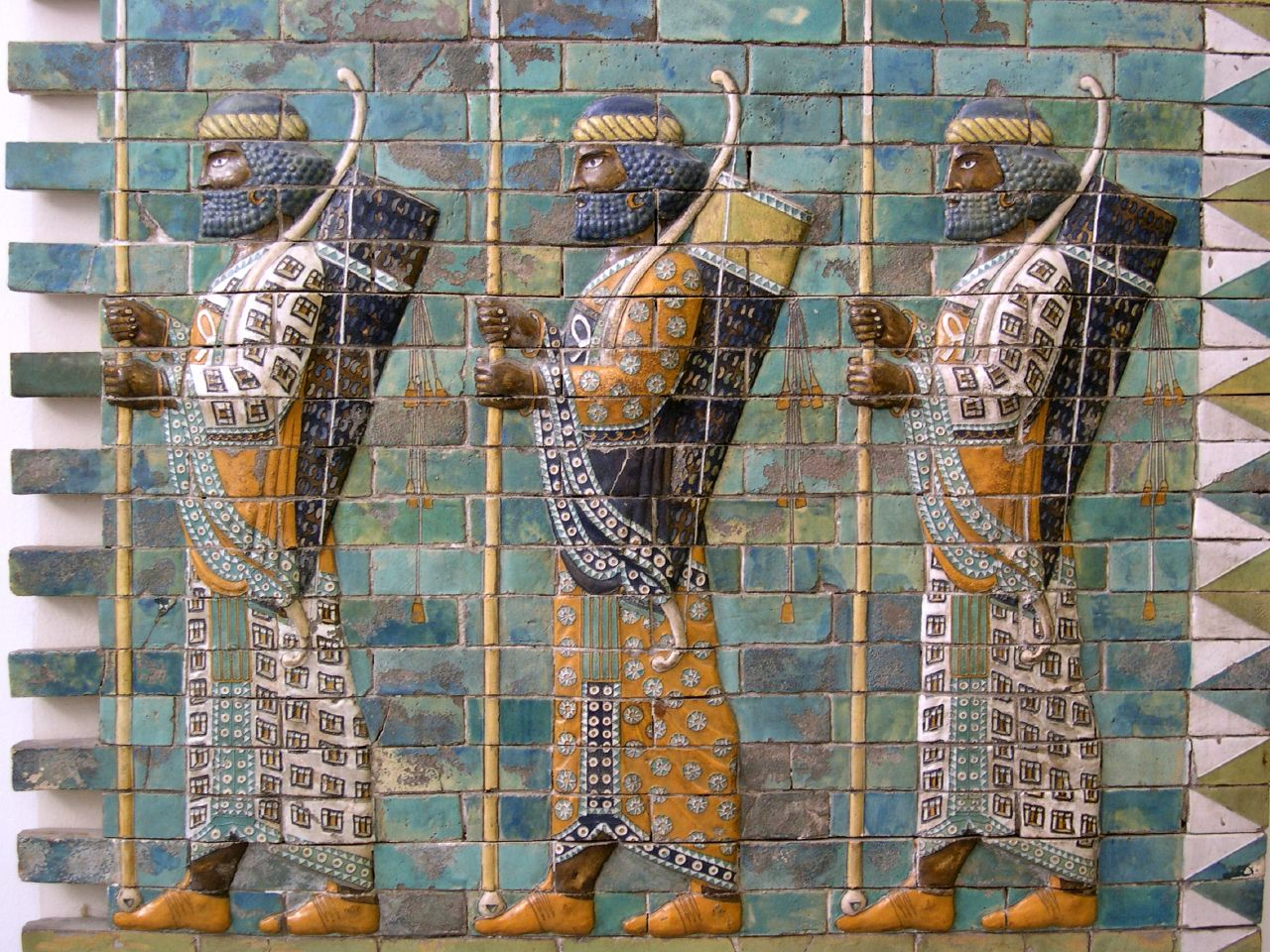
Relief of Achaemenid soldiers from the Palace of Darius in Susa

The military of the Achaemenid Empire was the military apparatus of Iran from 550 to 330 BC.

== Organization and training ==
Spāda served as the collective name for the professional army. Its divisions included infantry soldiers (pasti), horse riders (asabāri), camel riders (ušabāri), charioteers, and large numbers of support personnel. The chariot was an outdated combat tool, and was only used for symbolic purposes by top ranking warriors.

A supreme commander headed the entire spāda. This official was likely called a spādapati, though a general with complete civil power held the title kārana. The King of Kings personally filled this role or assigned it to a closely trusted friend or family member. For example, Mazares commanded the troops under Cyrus the Great (r. 550–530 BC), while Datis did it under Darius the Great (r. 522–486 BC) at the battle of Marathon. Achaemenid commanders and officials regularly engaged in direct combat, leading to frequent battlefield deaths, such as five out of eleven sons of Darius; Ariabignes, Achaemenes, Arsames, Abrocomes, and Hyperanthes.

Persian aristocrats underwent rigorous training. Formed into groups of fifty, young Persians trained in running, swimming, caring for horses, farming, livestock management, handicrafts, and guard duty. Instruction also included hunting on foot or horseback, archery, spear and javelin throwing, as well as surviving long marches in harsh environments. Professional military service lasted from ages twenty to fifty in either the infantry or cavalry. Elite units received training for both roles. In relation to this, Darius is known to have said; "Trained am I both with hands and with feet. As a horseman I am a good horseman. As a bowman I am a good bowman both afoot and on horseback. As a spearman I am a good spearman both afoot and on horseback".

== Ethnic composition ==
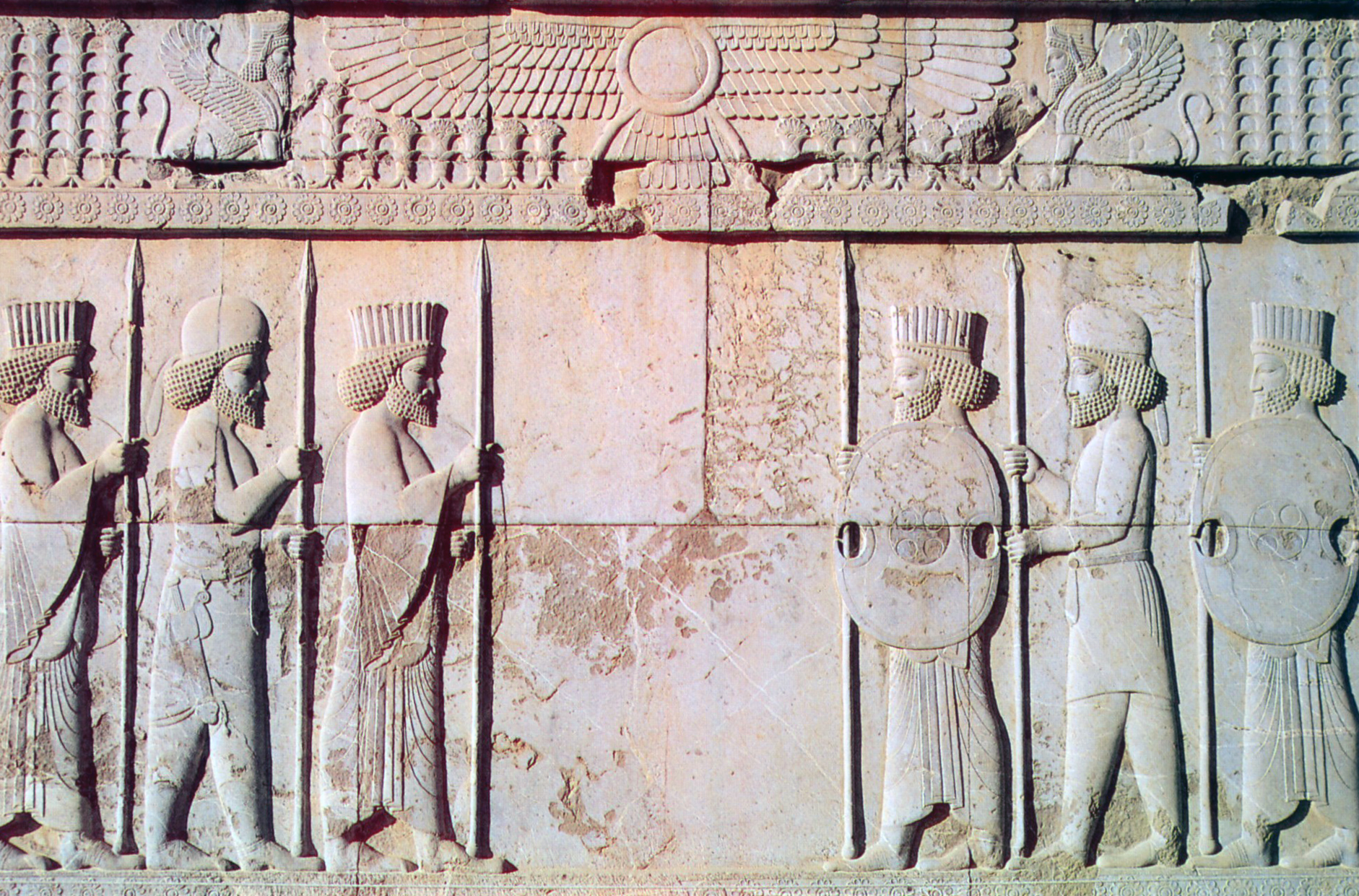
Achaemenid rock relief in Persepolis depicting Persian (rounded hats) and Median soldiers

Groups closer to the Persians supplied with more soldiers and paid less tribute. As a result, the Medes held second rank in the empire, contributing with more soldiers than other non-Persian groups and producing generals such as Mazares, Harpagus, Taxmaspada, and Datis. Subsequent troop contributions came from Eastern Iranian groups such as the Saka, Bactrians, and Hyrcanians.

The Achaemenids incorporated Greek subjects and mercenaries into their military from their earliest encounters with the Greeks, beginning under Cyrus and Cambyses II (r. 530–522 BC). Over time, Greek mercenaries found employment with local Achaemenid satraps in Anatolia as well as with the King of Kings, receiving food, lodging, and monthly wages, such as a single gold daric per month in 401 BC. During the Wars of Alexander the Great, Greek mercenaries formed a standard element of the Achaemenid army, with their leaders being part of the Iranian aristocracy. These mercenaries were important to cultural interactions between Greeks and Persians and helped spread Greek cultural influences into the east.

== Equipment ==
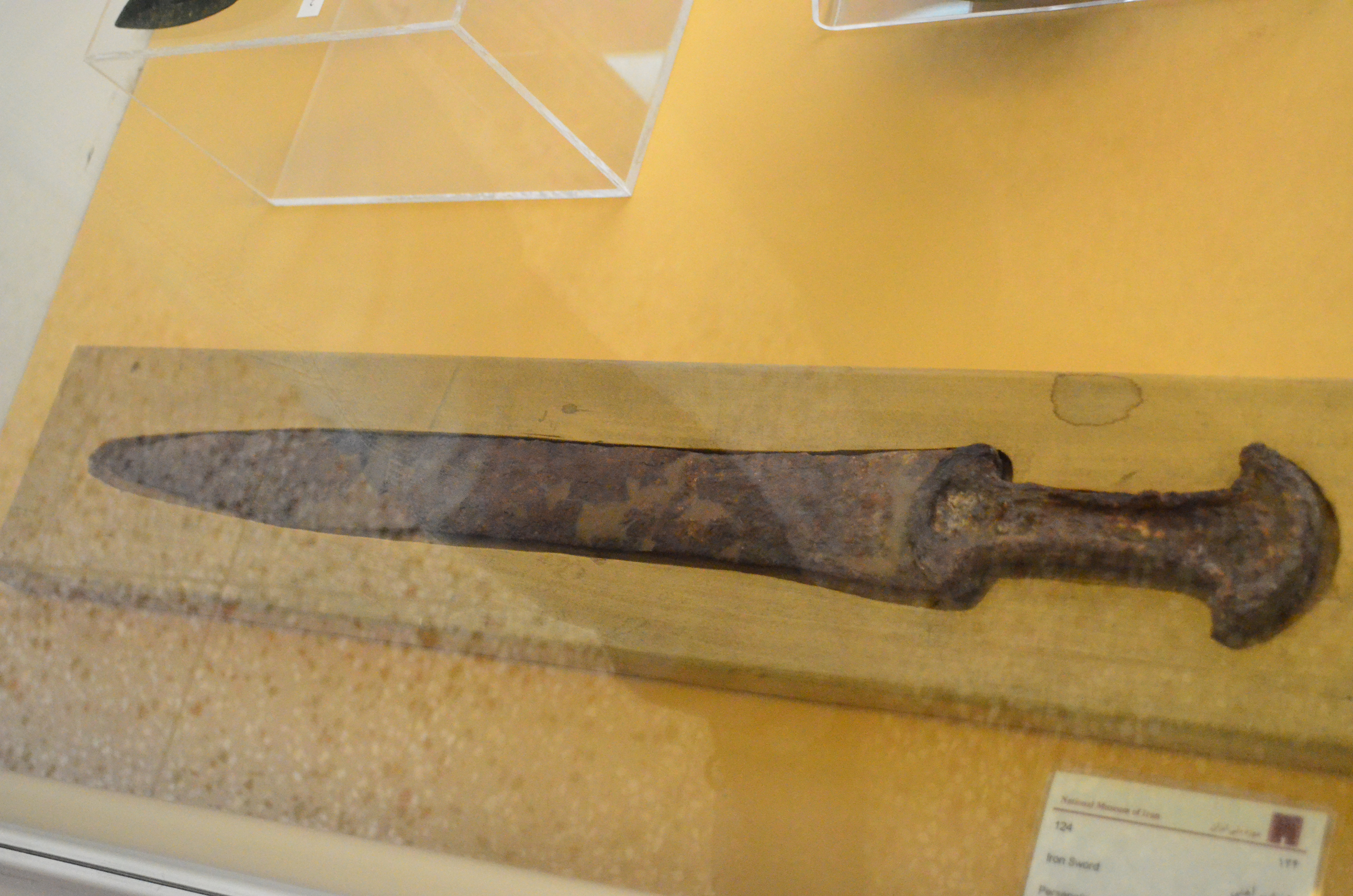
An acinaces in the National Museum of Iran

Equipment for infantry soldiers included a short sword known as an acinaces, a wooden spear with metal on both the front and back ends, a container for both a bow and arrows, reed arrows with iron or bronze tips, and a bow approximately one meter long with ends carved like animal heads. The bow served as an Iranian national weapon and royal emblem, visible in the hand of the King of Kings on royal tombs and coins.

Use of the battle axe was also common, particularly by North Iranians. Troops used wicker shields made of sticks woven through moist leather to deflect arrows. Shield designs were either small and crescent shaped or large and rectangular, with the latter capable of standing in the ground to provide cover for archers. Some guards used the large Boeotian shield, while Gandharan forces carried round shields resembling those used by Greek hoplites.

Only Mesopotamian and Egyptian troops wore body armor, while metal helmets were worn by some Persians. Elite infantry units dressed in varied outfits. Some wore Elamite court fashion with a fluted hat, a short cape over a shirt, a pleated skirt, and strapped footwear. Others wore Median cavalry clothing with a conical felt hat, tight tunic, trousers, and boots.

== See also ==
- Parthian army
- Military of the Sasanian Empire

== Sources ==
- Shahbazi, Alireza Shapour (1986). "Army i. Pre-Islamic Iran". In Yarshater, Ehsan (ed.). Encyclopædia Iranica (Online ed.). Encyclopædia Iranica Foundation. ISBN 978-0710091109.
