= Aryenis =

Daughter of the Lydian king Alyattes

- Spouse: Astyages
- Issue: Mandane (?); Amytis (?)
- Father: Alyattes

Aryenis (Ancient Greek: Αρυηνις, romanized: Aruēnis; Latin: Aryenis) was, according to Herodotus, the daughter of the Lydian king Alyattes and the sister of the Lydian king Croesus.

== Name ==
The name Aryenis comes from the Latin transliteration of the Ancient Greek Aruēnis (Αρυηνις), which was itself the Hellenised form of a Lydian name cognate with the Hittite term arawanni- (𒂖), which meant "free", that is a free person, as opposed to an enslaved or unfree person.

== Family ==
Following the Battle of the Eclipse, she was married to Astyages, son of the Median king Cyaxares as part of a diplomatic marriage to seal a peace treaty between Media and Lydia. Aryenis became the Queen consort of Astyages when he succeeded Cyaxares.

Herodotus does not clearly identify her as the mother of Mandane (the wife of Cambyses I of Anshan) and there is speculation that she may have been born to an earlier wife of Astyages.
