= Battle of Halule =

Ancient battle

Date	c. 691 BC
Location	Halule
Result	Assyrian victory

Belligerents
Babylon; Elam; Iranian–Aramean coalition Persians; Medes; Chaldeans	Assyria

Commanders and leaders
Mushezib-Marduk; Humban-nimena III; Achaemenes	Sennacherib

Casualties and losses
Large	Large

The Battle of Halule took place in 691 BC between the Assyrian empire and the rebelling forces of the Babylonians, Chaldeans, Persians, Medes, Elamites and Aramaic tribes.

== Background ==
During the reign of King Sennacherib of Assyria, Babylonia was in a constant state of revolt. Mushezib-Marduk the Chaldean prince chosen as King of Babylon led the Babylonian populace in revolt against Assyria and King Sennacherib.

== Rebellion forces ==
Achaemenes recruited a new army to help the Babylonians against the Assyrians, under the leadership of Mushezib-Marduk. As well as the Babylonians, the Aramean tribes, the Chaldeans and Humban-nimena III of Elam, and all the Zagros Iranians (Persia, Anshan, Ellipi, etc.) joined in rebellion against the Assyrians. The nucleus of the army consisted of Elamite, Median and Persian charioteers, infantry, and cavalrymen.

== Result ==
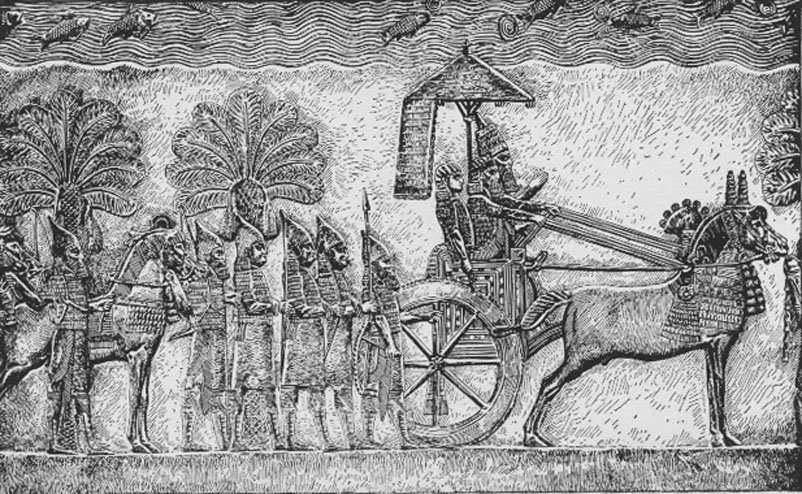
Sennacherib during his Babylonian war

The battle was indecisive, or at least both sides claimed the victory in their annals and all rulers remained on their thrones. However, Sennacherib captured Babylon after a 9 month siege and Ashurbanipal destroyed Elam after 40 years of fighting.

Mushezib-Marduk lost his ally when the Elamite king Humban-nimena suffered a stroke later that same year, an opportunity King Sennacherib quickly seized by attacking Babylon, and eventually capturing it after a nine-month siege. Babylon was destroyed by Sennacherib. The Persians and Medes were then subjugated. There was further fighting between Elam and Assyria over the next 40 years until Elam was destroyed by Ashurbanipal.
