= Artanes (son of Hystaspes) =

Ancient Persian prince and brother to Darius the Great

Artanes (Ancient Greek: Ἀρτάνης) was a prince of ancient Persia, the son of the satrap Hystaspes, and brother of Darius the Great.

He gave his only daughter, named Phratagune, in marriage to his brother Darius, as well as his entire estate as a dowry. This was done largely because Artanes had no male heirs, so this move would keep Artanes's property in the family.

He was afterwards one of the distinguished Persians who fought and fell in the Battle of Thermopylae.
