= Phratagune =

Ancient Persian princess and wife to Darius the Great

Phratagune (or Phratagone) was a princess of ancient Persia, the only daughter of Artanes, who lived around the 5th century BCE.

Phratagune's father gave her in marriage to his brother, her uncle, Darius the Great. This was ostensibly because Artanes had no male heirs and marrying his daughter to his brother, and offering his entire estate as her dowry, would enable his fortune to remain in the family. This also had the side effect of ensuring Phratagune would produce no rival claimants to the throne. Contemporary accounts suggest this was not seen as an incestuous relationship, but a socially acceptable form of interfamilial alliance.

Phratagune bore Darius two sons, Abrocomes and Hyperanthes, both of whom died at the Battle of Thermopylae, as did her father.
