= Halule =

Halule (Akkadian: Ḫalulê, a transliteration of cuneiform written Ha-le-lu-e) was a city that is unrecognized archaeologically, although there are speculations that its ruins should be sought somewhere near Baghdad. The city is known mainly for the Battle of Halule in 691 BC between the armies of the Assyrian king Sennacherib (705–681 BC) and the combined armies of the Babylonians, Arameans, Chaldeans, Elamites and peoples from the Zagros Mountains.
