= Gilzan =

Ancient near eastern kingdom

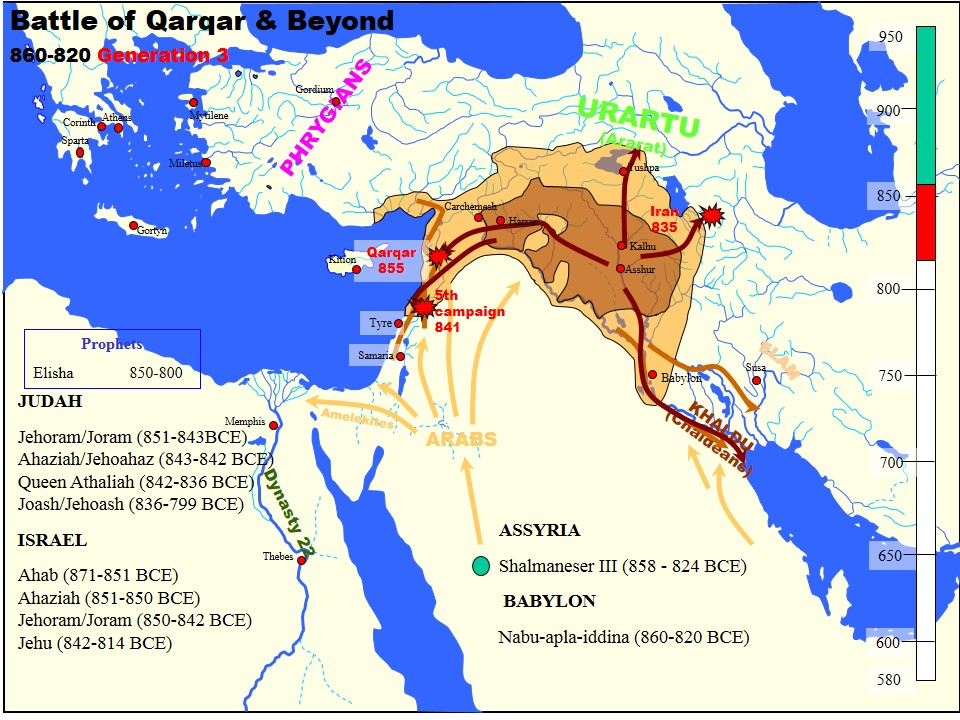
The expansion of the Neo-Assyrian Empire under Shalmaneser III included the vassalisation of Gilzan.

Map of Urartu between 735 BC and 715 BC, Gilzan is shown west of Lake Urmia.

Gilzan or the kingdom of Gilzan, also known as Gilzanu, was a late Bronze Age and early Iron Age kingdom in the ancient near east, lying between the ancient great powers of Assyria and Urartu. Not much is known about Gilzans history, Gilzan is primarily known from Assyrian and Urartian sources.

== History ==
Gilzan first emerges in historical records in the 9th century BC. Initially, it appears to have been an independent kingdom, maintaining autonomy before eventually becoming part of the kingdom of Urartu. During the mid-9th century BC, as Shalmaneser III expanded his empire, Gilzan was conquered and transformed into a vassal state of the Neo-Assyrian Empire. Over time, its integration into Assyrian control deepened, and it was likely fully absorbed into the empire under the reign of Sargon II in the late 8th century BC. Following this period, Gilzan itself disappears from the historical record. The territory of Gilzan was conquered together with Assyria and Urartu by the Median Empire in the late-7th century BC.

== Location ==
The exact location of Gilzan is debated, it is known to have been north of Assyria, bordering Urartu, most likely somewhere around Lake Urmia. The modern Iranian cities of Salmas or Miandoab could have been its cite. Somewhere in the Zagros mountains, near the lake, is also seen as a possibility.

== Rulers ==
Although Assyrian inscriptions from the 9th century BC mention the 'kings' of Gilzan, there is still debate over whether Gilzan was truly a kingdom or not.

A list of Gilzans 'kings':

- Unknown king (c. 883–c. 880 BC)
- Asau (c. mid-9th century BC)
- Upu (c. 827 BC)

== See also ==
- List of rulers of the pre-Achaemenid kingdoms of Iran

== Bibliography ==
- Qashqai, Hamidreza, Chronicle of early Iran history, Tehran, Avegan press, 2011 (in Persian: گاهنمای سپیده دم تاریخ در ایران )
