= Artyphius =

5th-century BC Achaemenid general

- Old Persian: Ardufya
- Dynasty: Achaemenid
- Father: Artabanus
- Military career
- Allegiance: Achaemenid Empire
- Commands: Contingents of Gandharian and Dadicae
- Conflicts: Second Persian invasion of Greece

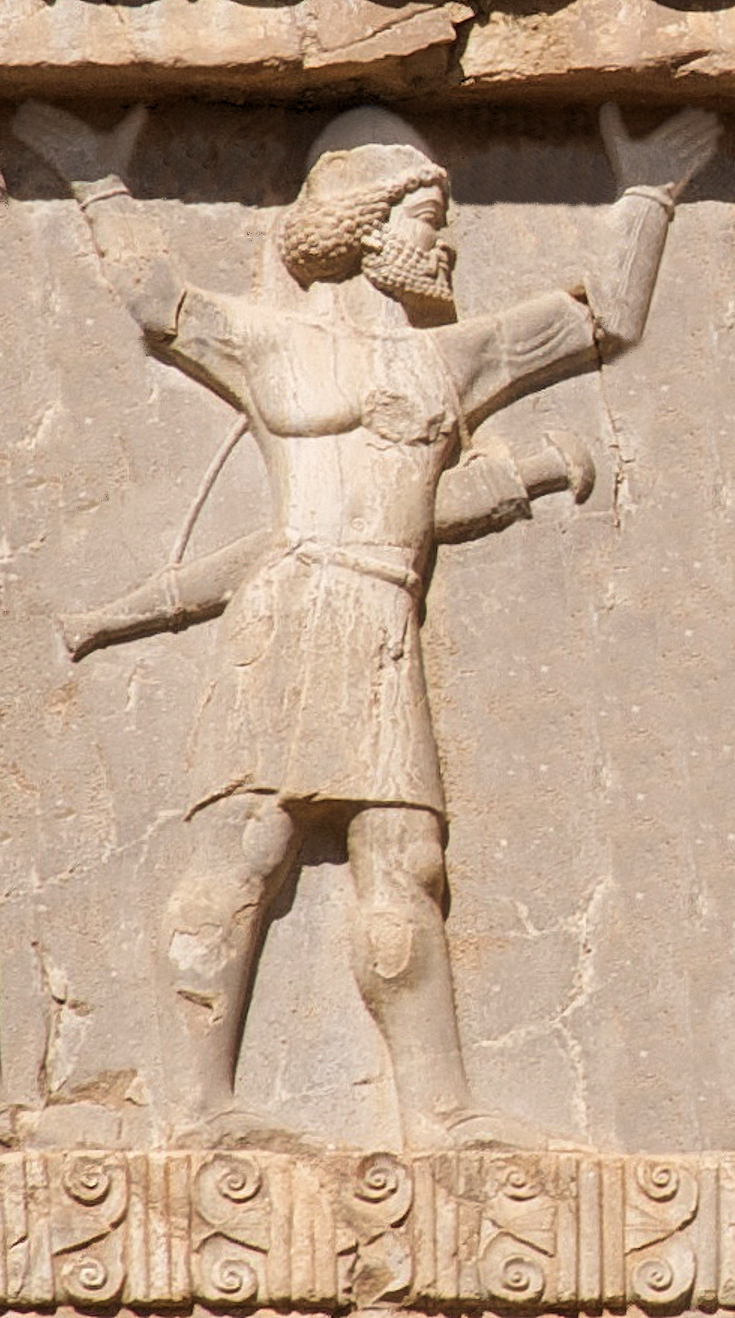
The Gandharan soldiers (here depicted on the tomb of Xerxes I) were under the command of Artyphius during the Second Persian invasion of Greece (480-479 BCE).

Artyphius (Old Persian: *R̥difyah; Ancient Greek: Ἀρτύφιος, romanized: Artúphios) was a general of the Achaemenid Army during the Second Persian invasion of Greece (480-479 BCE). He was the son of Artabanus, grandson of Hystaspes, and therefore nephew of Darius the Great and first degree cousin of Xerxes I.

According to Herodotus, Artyphius was in command of the contingents of the Gandharian and Dadicae in the invading Achaemenid army of Xerxes I:

The Parthians and Chorasmians had for their commander Artabazus son of Pharnaces, the Sogdians Azanes son of Artaeus, the Gandarians and Dadicae Artyphius son of Artabanus.

— Herodotus VII 64-66

Artyphius had a brother, named Tritantaechmes, who also a general in the army of Xerxes I.
