= Cyrus I =

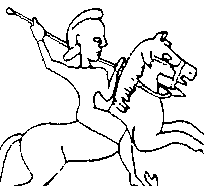
- Cyrus I on horseback from a seal

King of Persia
- Reign: 600–580 BC
- Predecessor: Teispes
- Successor: Cambyses I
- Died: 580 BC; Anshan
- Burial: 580 BC; Gur-e-Dokhtar
- Spouse: Parsumaš
- Issue: Cambyses I Arukku
- Dynasty: Achaemenid (Teispid)
- Father: Teispes
- Religion: Ancient Iranian religion

Cyrus I (Old Persian: Kuruš) or Cyrus I of Anshan or Cyrus I of Persia, was King of Anshan in Persia from c. 600 to 580 BC or, according to others, from c. 652 to 600 BC. Cyrus I of Anshan is the grandfather of Cyrus the Great, also known as Cyrus II. His name in Modern Persian is کوروش, Kūroš, while in Greek he was called Κῦρος, Kȳros.

== Life ==
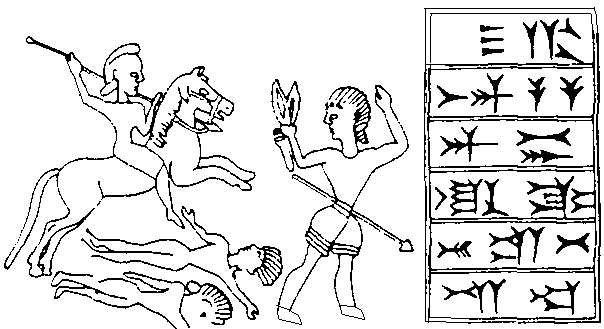
Seal of Cyrus I from Anshan

Cyrus was an early member of the Achaemenid dynasty. He was apparently a grandson of its founder Achaemenes and son of Teispes, king of Anshan. Teispes' sons reportedly divided the kingdom between them after his death. Cyrus reigned as king of Anshan while his brother Ariaramnes was king of Parsa.

The chronological placement of this event is uncertain. This is due to his suggested, but still debated identification, with the monarch known as "Kuraš of Parsumaš". Kuraš is first mentioned c. 652 BC. In that year Shamash-shum-ukin, king of Babylon (668–648 BC), revolted against his older brother and overlord Ashurbanipal, king of Assyria (668–627 BC). Cyrus is mentioned being in a military alliance with the former. The war between the two brothers ended in 648 BC with the defeat and reported suicide of Shamash-shum-ukin.

Cyrus is mentioned again in 639 BC. At that year Ashurbanipal managed to defeat Elam and became overlord to several of its former allies. Kuraš was apparently among them. His elder son Arukku (< *Ariy-uka) was reportedly sent to Assyria to pay tribute to its King. Kuraš then seems to vanish from the historical record. His suggested identification with Cyrus would help connect the Achaemenid dynasty to the major events of the 7th century BC.

Ashurbanipal died in 627 BC. Cyrus presumably continued paying tribute to his sons and successors Ashur-etil-ilani (627–623 BC) and Sin-shar-ishkun (623–612 BC). They were both opposed by an alliance led by Cyaxares of Media (633–584 BC) and Nabopolassar of Babylon (626–605 BC). In 612 BC the two managed to capture the Assyrian capital Nineveh. This was effectively the end of the Neo-Assyrian Empire though remnants of the Assyrian Army under Ashur-uballit II (612–609 BC) continued to resist from Harran.

Media and Babylon soon shared the lands previously controlled by the Assyrians. Anshan apparently fell under the control of the former. Cyrus is considered to have ended his days under the overlordship of either Cyaxares or his son Astyages (584–550 BC). Cyrus was succeeded by his son Cambyses I. His grandson would come to be known as Cyrus the Great, founder of the Persian Empire.

It has been noted that this account of his life and reign would place his early activities more than a century before those of his grandson. This would place his fathering of Cambyses very late in life and his death at an advanced age. It has been argued that Kuraš and Cyrus were separate figures of uncertain relation to each other. The latter would have then reigned in the early 6th century BC and his reign would seem rather uneventful. Due to the current lack of sufficient records for this historical period it remains uncertain which theory is closer to the facts.

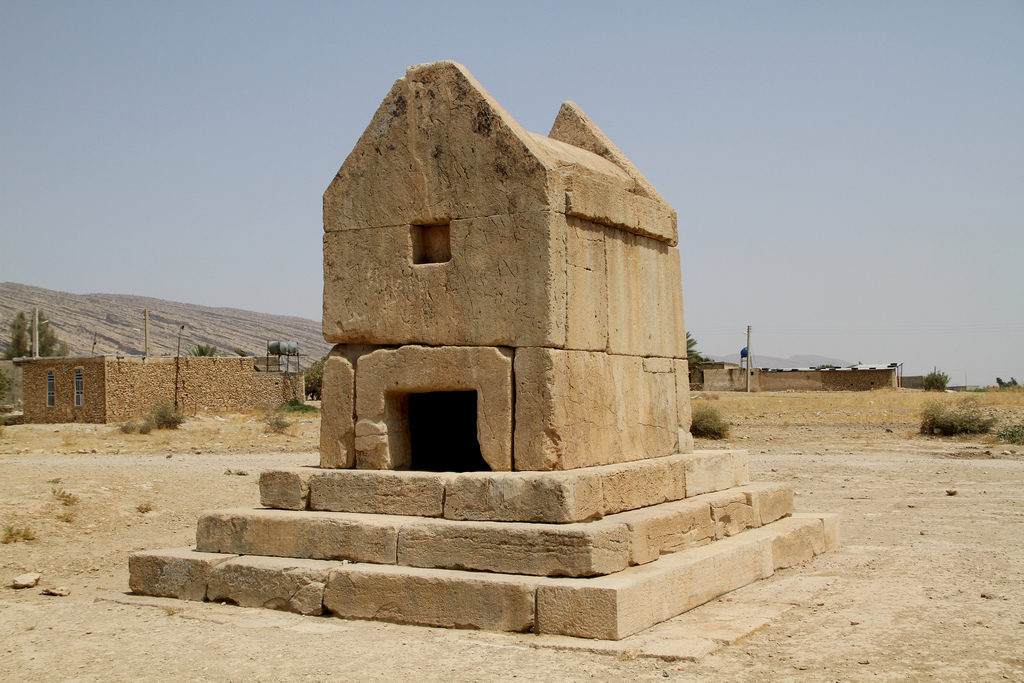
Possible tomb of Cyrus I, known by locals as the Gur-e-Dokhtar.

It has been suggested by Louis Vandenberg that the Gur-e-Dokhtar is the tomb of Cyrus I. This is because all Achaemenid kings after Darius the Great were buried in rock-cut tombs, and because a similar building has been attributed to Cyrus the Great, it seemed logical to assume that a tomb like this must have been erected prior to the reign of Cyrus. However, other experts have claimed that it is the burial place of Mandane, mother of Cyrus the Great, while other scholars claim that the Gur-e-Dokhtar was the mausoleum of Atossa, the daughter of Cyrus the Great and the wife and queen of Darius the Great. Later, when the iron clamps were studied, it became clear that this building was erected in the 5th century BC, so it may have been for prince Cyrus the Younger.

Cyrus I Achaemenid dynasty Born: Unknown Died: 580 BC
Preceded by Teispes	King of Anshan; 640–580 BC	Succeeded by Cambyses I
