= Arukku =

Son of Kira 1

Arukku (Old Persian: *Aryauka or *Aryavuka, or *Aryūka; Neo-Assyrian Akkadian: 𒀀𒊒𒊌𒆪, romanized: Arukku; Elamite: 𒄯𒊑𒌋𒊌𒋡, romanized: Har(r)iuwukka; Imperial Aramaic: 𐡀𐡓𐡉𐡅𐡊, romanized: Aryuk; * before 656 BC) was the eldest son of King Kuras (Cyrus I) from Parsumaš.

== Mention in Assyrian records ==
In connection with the destruction of Susa, which was effectively the dissolution of the kingdom of Elam by Ashurbanipal, Kuras (Cyrus I) sent Arukku to Nineveh to recognize the supremacy of the Assyrians in 639 BC. The distinction equating Parsua with Parsumaš would mean that the referenced Cyrus may have meanwhile taken over the sovereignty of one of many kings. In 835 BC, in the 24th year of the reign of Shalmaneser III, Parsua was described as a country with 27 kings.

== Traditional identifications ==
Traditionally Arukku is usually identified as the son of Cyrus I. The mention serves as proof for the oldest message in the Persian royal family. This was followed by the derivation that Cambyses I must have been another son. According to this chronology, in which Cyrus already occurs as a father and king, the birth of Cyrus would be no later than 680 to 675 BC.

== Alternative explanations ==
The Kyros mentioned by Ashurbanipal did not have vassal status, but gave voluntary gifts to Assyria to ensure friendly relations with the new neighbor. However, these gifts were recorded in the Assyrian king's lists as a tribute. The traditional derivation is not always mentioned by all historians, since the age of Cyrus is thought to be too high and the reading of the name Arukkus is considered uncertain. Other historians doubt the equation of Parsumaš with Parsa and comment on the traditional identifications as obsolete and refuted.
