= Artabanus (son of Hystaspes) =

Brother of and advisor to Achaemenid king Darius I

- Issue: Artyphius
- Dynasty: Achaemenid
- Father: Hystaspes

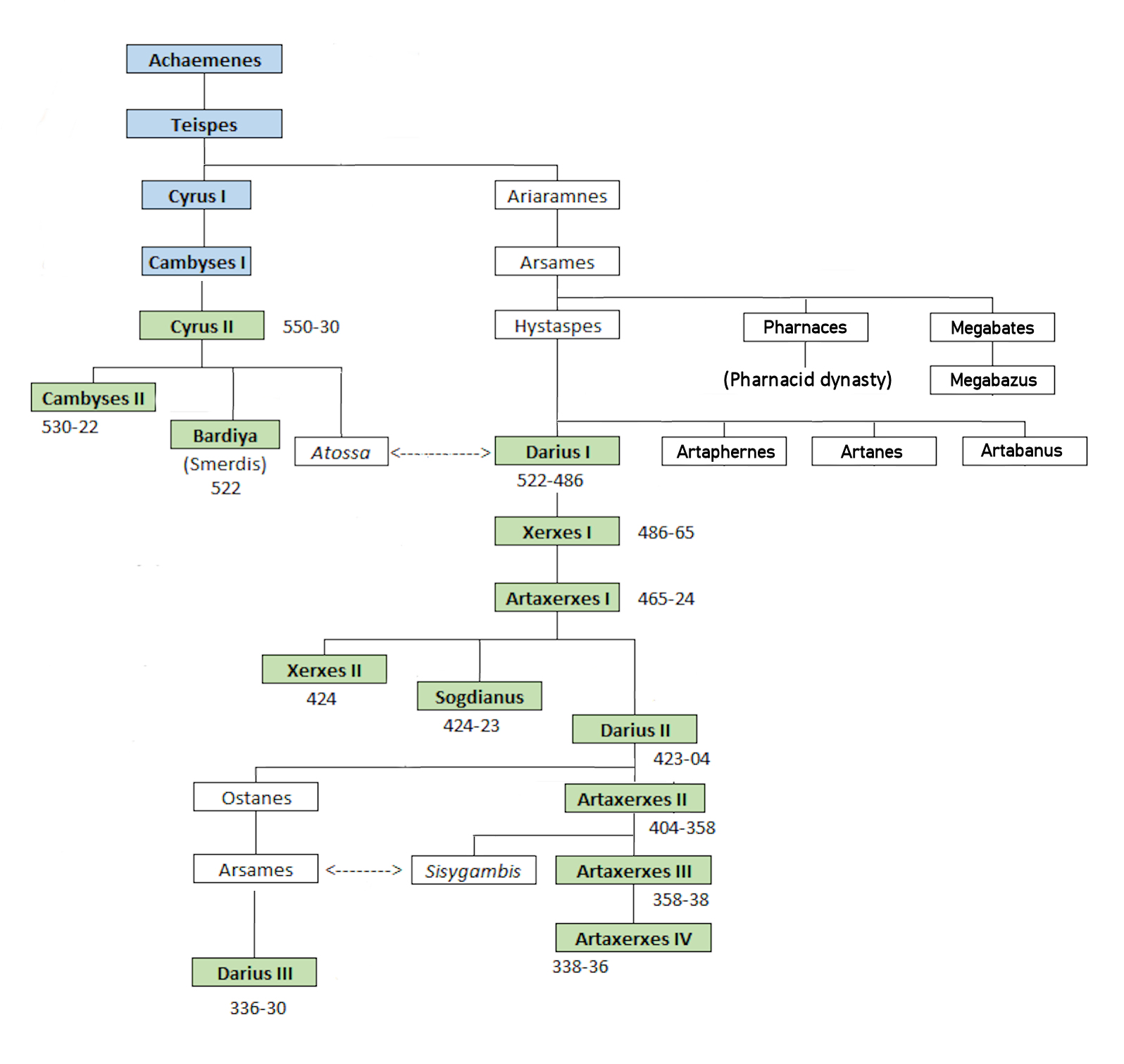
Artabanus was a son of Hystaspes, and brother of Darius I (Achaemenid lineage according to Darius the Great in the Behistun inscription).

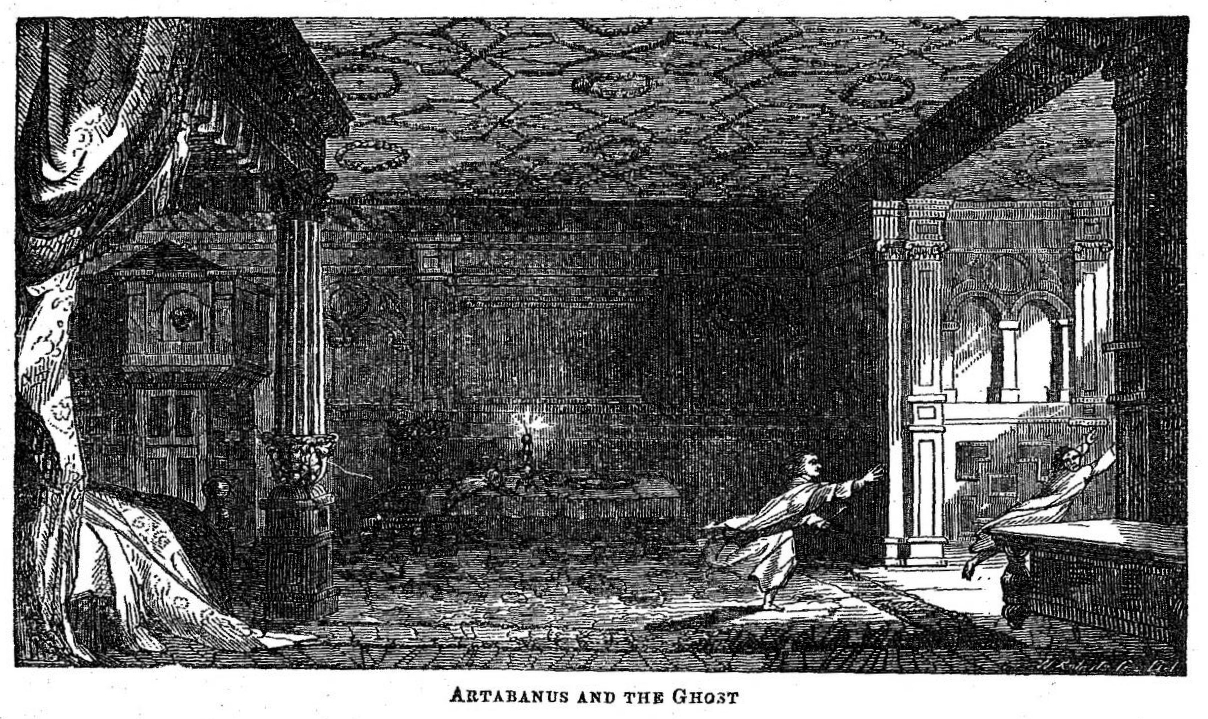
Artabanus and the Ghost. According to Herodotus, Artabanus saw a ghost enjoining him to allow the invasion of Greece.

Artabanus was a son of Hystaspes, and therefore brother of Darius I as well as uncle of Xerxes I.

Artabanus had a reputation for great wisdom. Artabanus is known to have advised his brother Darius I against the Achaemenid campaign against the Scythians, saying that the Scythians were "impossible to deal with", but he wasn't heard, and the invasion proceeded, but was ultimately unsuccessful as Artabanus had predicted.

According to Herodotus, Artabanus saw a ghost enjoining him to allow the invasion of Greece, which decided both him and Xerxes to launch the invasion without delay.

According to Herodotus, Artabanus had a son named Artyphius, who became a general of Xerxes I in the Second Persian invasion of Greece (480-479 BC). Artyphius was in charge of the Gandharian and Dadicae contingents of the Achaemenid army. Artyphius therefore seems to have been a cousin of Xerxes I.
