= Abrocomes =

Son of King Darius I (died 480 BC)

- Died: Thermopylae, Greece
- Father: Darius I of Persia
- Mother: Phratagune

Abrocomes (Ancient Greek: Ὰβροκόμης) was a son of king Darius I of Persia and his wife Phratagune, who died with his full brother Hyperanthes in the battle of Thermopylae, while fighting over the body of Leonidas.
