= Hyperanthes =

Son of Persian king Darius I (died 480 BC)

Hyperanthes (Ancient Greek: Ὑπεράνθης) was a son of Darius the Great of Persia by Phratagune, and brother to Xerxes I. He was present in the second invasion of Greece in 480 BC. According to Herodotus, he fought and died alongside his other brother Abrocomes in the battle of Thermopylae in the final phase known as the "Battle of Champions" (translation of Tom Holland), where the Spartans in their last stand fought feverishly against him and the Persian force over the retrieval of Leonidas' dead body.
