= Hystaspes (father of Darius I) =

c. 550 BC Persian satrap of Bactria and Persis

- Satrap of Bactria; Satrap of Persis
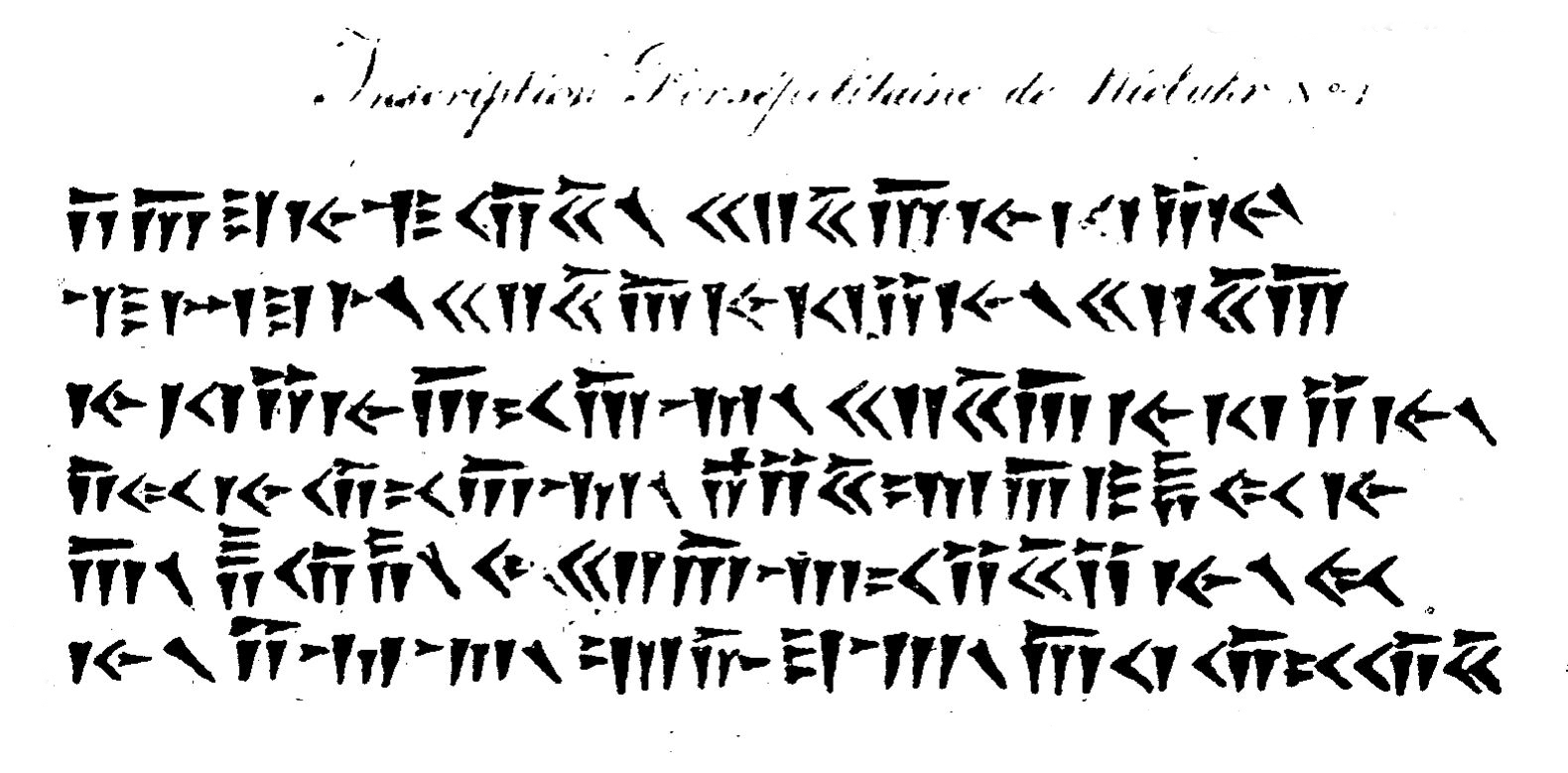
- A "Niebuhr inscription" reading "Darius the Great King, King of Kings, King of countries, son of Hystaspes, an Achaemenian, who built this Palace".
- Died: c. 499
- Burial: Persepolis
- Issue: Darius I; Artabanus; Artaphernes; Artanes
- Old Persian: Vištāspa
- Ancient Greek: Hustáspēs
- Persian: Guštāsp
- Dynasty: Achaemenid
- Father: Arsames
- Military career
- Allegiance: Cyrus the Great
- Conflicts: Expedition against the Massagetae

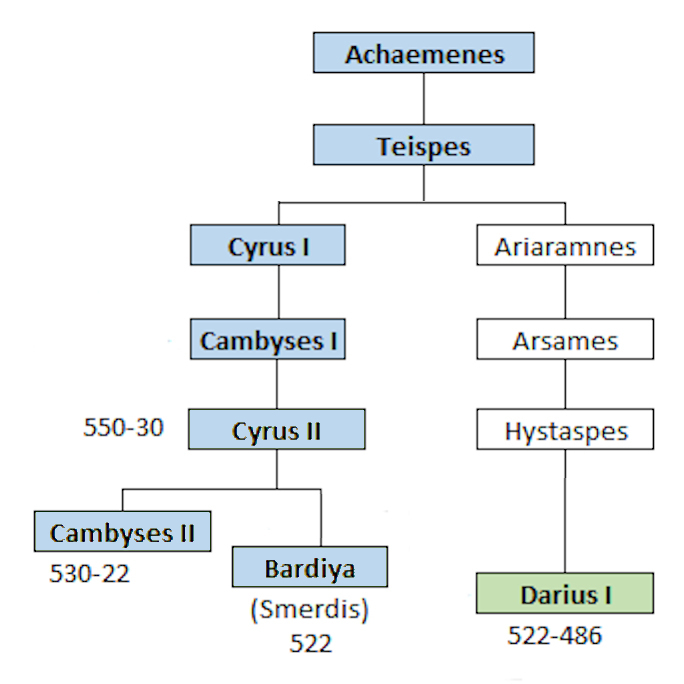
Position of Hystaspes in the Achaemenid lineage according to Darius the Great in the Behistun inscription.

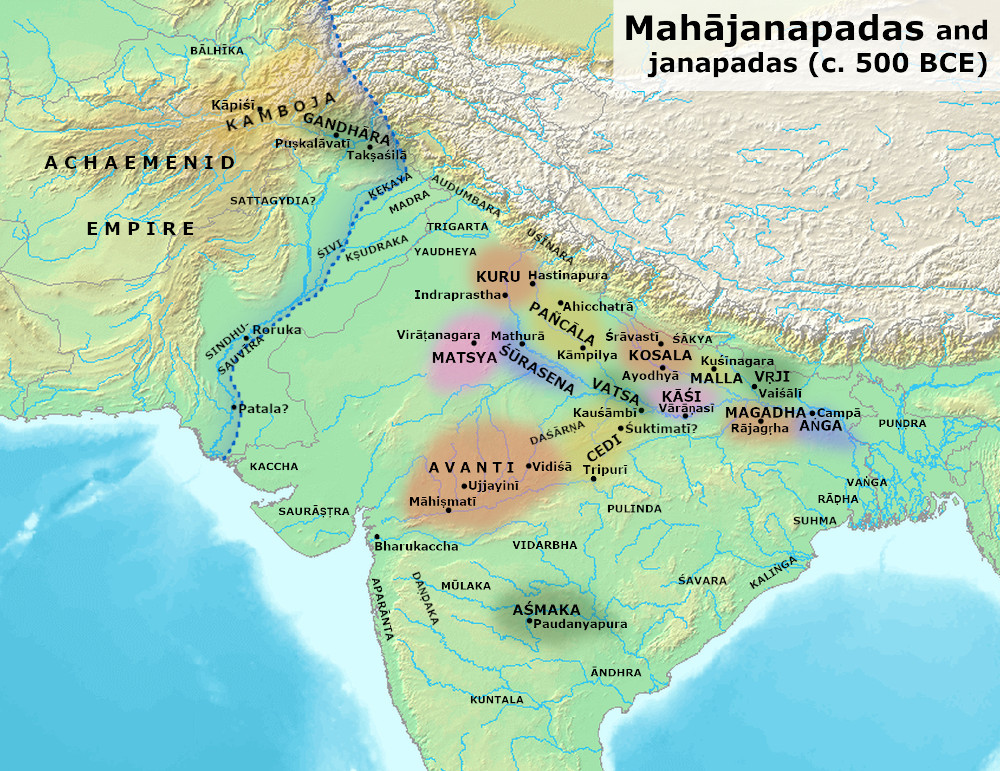
According to Ammianus Marcellinus, Hystaspes penetrated deep into India, where he learned from the Brahmins. Historically, this corresponds to the time of the Achaemenid conquest of the Indus Valley.

Hystaspes (Old Persian: 𐎻𐏁𐎫𐎠𐎿𐎱 Vištāspa; Ancient Greek: Ὑστάσπης Hustáspēs) or Guštāsp (Persian: گشتاسپ Guštāsp) (fl. 550 BC), was a Persian satrap of Bactria and Persis. He was the father of Darius I, king of the Achaemenid Empire, and Artabanus, who was a trusted advisor to both his brother Darius as well as Darius' son and successor, Xerxes I.

The son of Arsames, Hystaspes was a member of the Persian royal house of the Achaemenids. He was satrap of Persis under Cambyses II, and probably under his second cousin Cyrus the Great also. He accompanied Cyrus on his expedition against the Massagetae. However, he was sent back to Persis to keep watch over his eldest son, Darius, whom Cyrus, after a dream, suspected of considering treason.

Besides Darius, Hystaspes had three sons: Artabanus, Artaphernes, and Artanes, as well as a daughter who married Darius' lance-bearer Gobryas.

Ammianus Marcellinus makes him a chief of the Magians, and tells a story of his studying in India under the Brahmins, an event that would correspond to the Achaemenid conquest of the Indus Valley:

"Hystaspes, a very wise monarch, the father of Darius. Who while boldly penetrating into the remoter districts of upper India, came to a certain woody retreat, of which with its tranquil silence the Brahmans, men of sublime genius, were the possessors. From their teaching he learnt the principles of the motion of the world and of the stars, and the pure rites of sacrifice, as far as he could; and of what he learnt he infused some portion into the minds of the Magi, which they have handed down by tradition to later ages, each instructing his own children, and adding to it their own system of divination".

— Ammianus Marcellinus, XXIII. 6.

In ancient sources, Hystaspes is sometimes considered as identical with Vishtaspa (the Avestan name for Hystapes), an early patron of Zoroaster.

The name of Hystaspes occurs in the inscriptions at Persepolis and in the Behistun Inscription, where the full lineage of Darius the Great is given:

King Darius says: My father is Hystaspes; the father of Hystaspes was Arsames; the father of Arsames was Ariaramnes; the father of Ariaramnes was Teispes; the father of Teispes was Achaemenes. King Darius says: That is why we are called Achaemenids; from antiquity we have been noble; from antiquity has our dynasty been royal. King Darius says: Eight of my dynasty were kings before me; I am the ninth. Nine in succession we have been kings.

King Darius says: By the grace of Ahuramazda am I king; Ahuramazda has granted me the kingdom.

— Behistun Inscription

Hystaspes died in c. 499 and was buried in Persepolis, with a funerary cult subsequently being established in his name. Historian Lloyd Llewellyn-Jones suggests that the Takht-e Gohar, previously attributed as the tomb of Cambyses II, was actually that of Hystaspes.
