= Arsames =

Possible Achaemenid king of Persia (c. 520 BC)

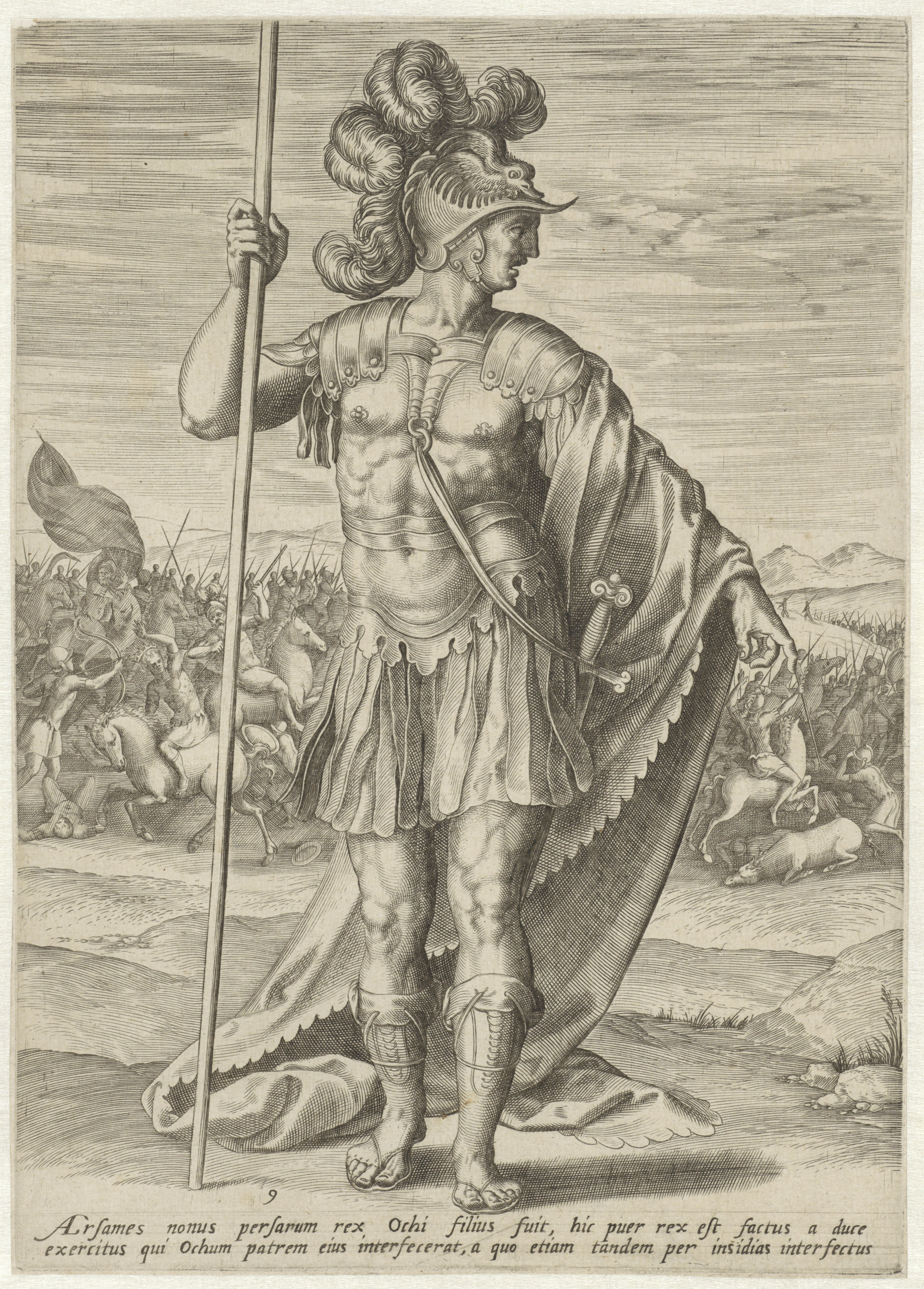
- Anonymous anachronistic engraving depicting King Arsames. Created in Antwerp, dated 1547-1585
- Died: After 522 BC
- Issue: Hystaspes; Pharnaces; Megabates
- Old Persian: Aršāma
- Modern Persian: Arshām
- Dynasty: Achaemenid
- Father: Ariaramnes

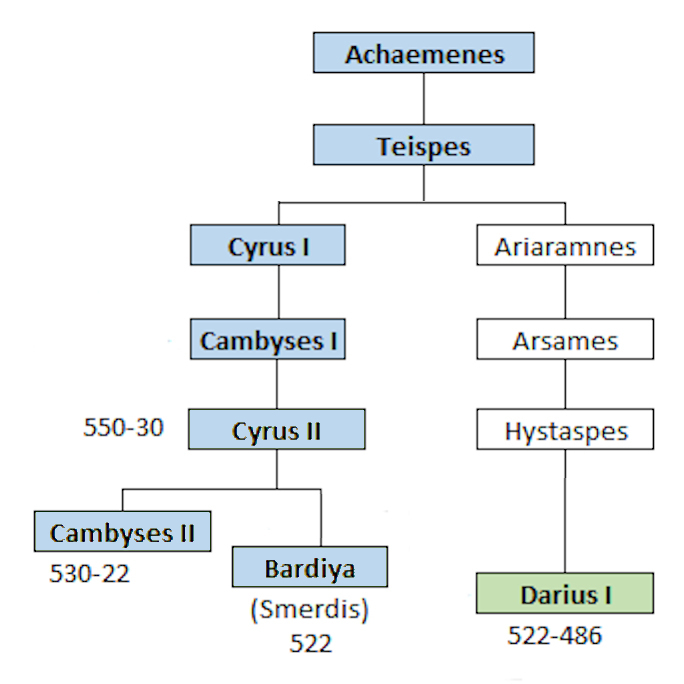
Position of Arsames in the Achaemenid lineage according to Darius the Great in the Behistun inscription.

Arsames (Old Persian: 𐎠𐎼𐏁𐎠𐎶 Aršāma, modern Persian:،آرسام، آرشام Arshām, Greek: Ἀρσάμης) was the son of Ariaramnes and the grandfather of Darius I. He was traditionally claimed to have briefly been king of Persia during the Achaemenid dynasty, and to have given up the throne and declared loyalty to his relative Cyrus II of Persia before retiring to his family estate in the Persian heartland of Parsa, living there peacefully for the rest of his life, perhaps nominally exercising the duties of a "lesser king" under the authority of the "Great King". However, the claim that he or his son were ever kings is rejected by historians such as Pierre Briant. In an inscription allegedly found in Hamadan he is called "king of Persia", but the document is widely argued to be a forgery, either modern or ancient. Another attestation of his reign is the Behistun Inscription, where his grandson Darius I lists him among his ancestors, although he does not explicitly mention him as being one of the anonymous eight kings whom he claims preceded him.

Arsames was the father of Hystaspes (satrap of Parthia), Pharnaces (satrap of Phrygia) and Megabates (a general). Arsames lived to see his grandson, Darius I, become the Great King of the Persian Empire, though he died during his reign. Arsames and his son Hystaspes are noted as being alive in 522 BC, indicating that he had survived well into old age.

His name (Aršāma) translates to "having a hero's strength". The feminine version of the name is Aršāmā (modern Persian:ارشاما [Arshāmā], Greek: Arsamē), and was the name of the daughter of Darius I, likely named in reference to him.

Arsames Achaemenid dynasty
Preceded by Ariamenes	King of Persia (disputed)	Succeeded by Cyrus II
