= Parsua =

Ancient tribal kingdom

Parsua (Parsuash/Parsumash) was an ancient iranian speaking tribal kingdom/chiefdom (860-600 BC). in Iron Age period in the central western Zagros mountains of Iran, frequently attested in Neo-Assyrian records. Parsua appears to have consisted originally of a number of small polities, each under the rule of a king.

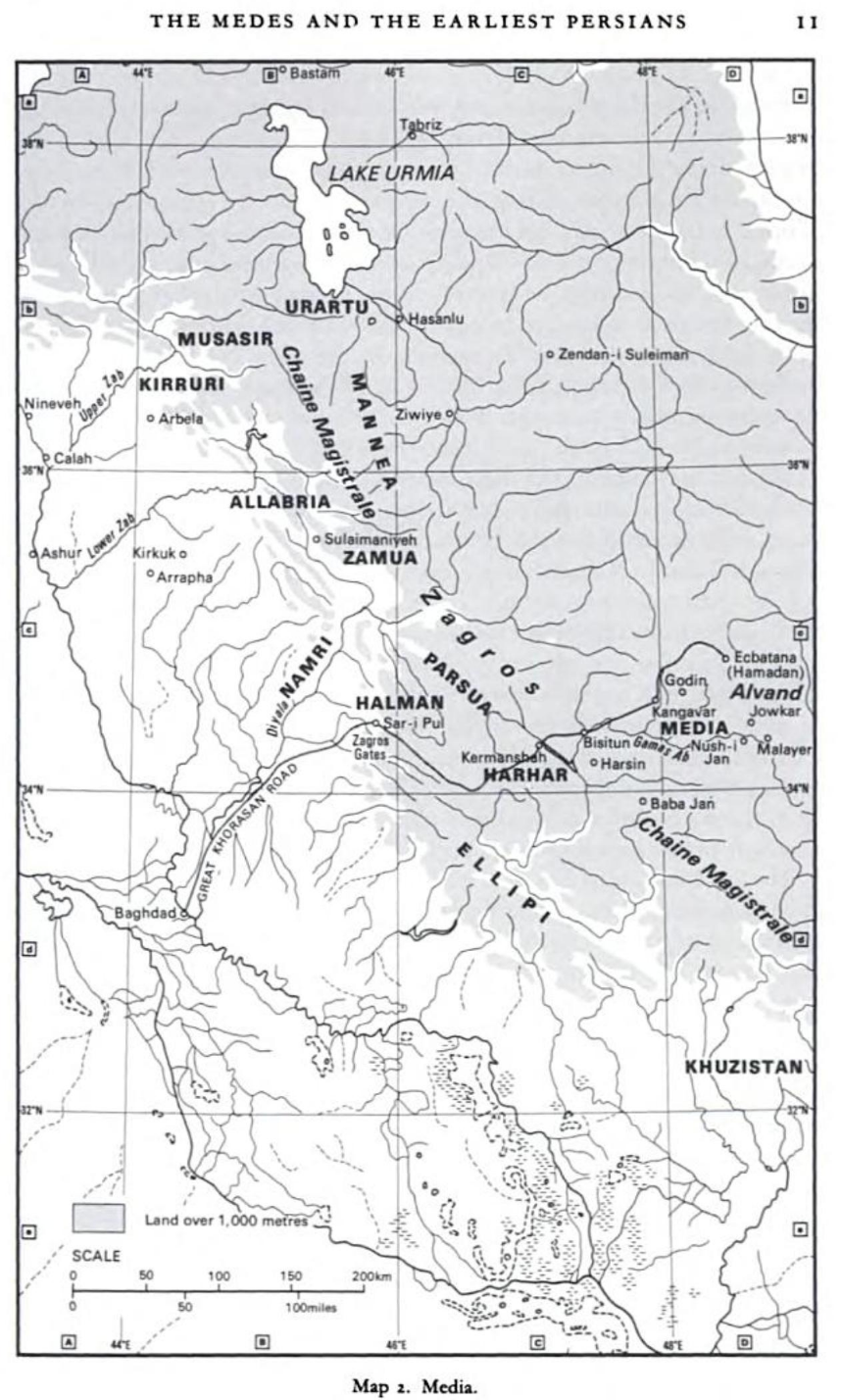
Map of the Land of Parsua

The name Parsua is from an old Iranian word Parsava and it is presumed to mean border or borderland.

The relationship between Parsa and the land in the central western Zagros mountains called Parsua, in Neo-Assyrian texts remains a matter of debate. In Greek, the name Parsa was represented as Persis.

In the inscription of Tiglath-pileser III, compiled in 728 B.C., province of parsua is part of the Assyrian empire with Namar, Bīt-Hamban, Bīt-Zatti (q.v.), etc.

== Reports ==
In my sixteenth regnal year I moved out from Arbail, crossed Mount Kullar, (and) established a fortress in the interior of the land Zamua. I conquered from the interior of the land Zamua to the land Munna (and) from the land Munna to the land Allabria (and) the city Paddira, the fortified city of Ianziburias, the Allabriaean. I took booty from him: a door of gold, his palace women, (and) the extensive property of his palace. I set ablaze (the regions stretching) from the city Allabria to the city Parsua, from the city Parsua to the city Abdadānu, (and) from the city Abdadānu to the city Haban, I overwhelmed them with my lordly brilliance.

— iii 58 – iv 6, Shalmaneser III II

== See also ==
- List of ancient Iranian peoples
