= Ariaramnes =

Early king of Persia of Achaemenid House

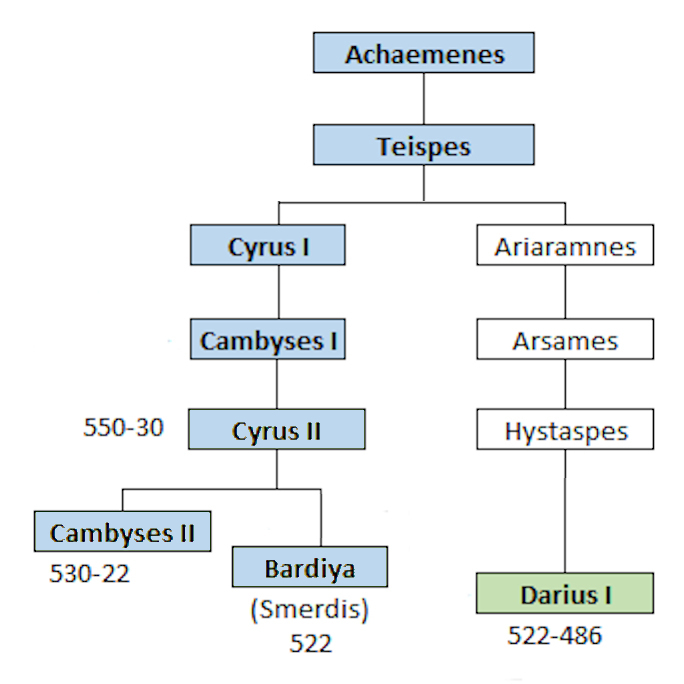
- Position of Ariaramnes in the Achaemenid lineage according to Darius the Great in the Behistun inscription.
- Issue: Arsames
- King of Parsa (possibly)
- Old Persian: 𐎠𐎼𐎡𐎹𐎠𐎼𐎶𐎴 (Ariyāramna)
- Modern Persian: اریارمنه
- Greek: Ἀριαράμνης
- Dynasty: Achaemenid
- Father: Teispes (probably)

Ariaramnes (Old Persian: 𐎠𐎼𐎡𐎹𐎠𐎼𐎶𐎴 Ariyāramna; "peace of the Arya") was a great-uncle of Cyrus the Great and the great-grandfather of Darius I, and perhaps the king of Parsa, the ancient core kingdom of Persia. Ariaramnes was most likely the brother of Cyrus I of Anshan and son of Teispes, but this is not certain. In any case, he was a member of the Achaemenid House. As supported by the relief at Behistun he was the first king of a separate Achaemenid branch that ran parallel to the reigns of Cyrus I and his son Cambyses I. As the great-grandfather of Darius the Great, this line ultimately absorbs the Dynasty and dominates the Persian Empire.

== Hamadan Tablet ==
Sometime in the first half of the 20th century, two gold tablets relating to Ariaramnes were found in Ecbatana, modern Hamadan. These gold tablets allegedly documented the reigns of Ariaramnes and his son Arsames and were written in Old Persian in the first person. This is the only evidence from the time documenting his reign and thus this branch of the Achaemenid royal family.

Another attestation of his reign is the later Behistun Inscription, where his great-grandson Darius I states that eight Achaemenid kings preceded him - and then, he must be counting Ariaramnes as a king.

His English name is derived - via Latin - from the Greek Ἀριαράμνης. In Modern Persian, his name is spelled اریارمنه.

Ariaramnes Achaemenid dynasty Born: ?? Died: ??
Preceded by Teispes	King of Persia	Succeeded by Arsames
