= Teispes =

7th century BC King of Persian Anshan

- Great King; King of Anshan
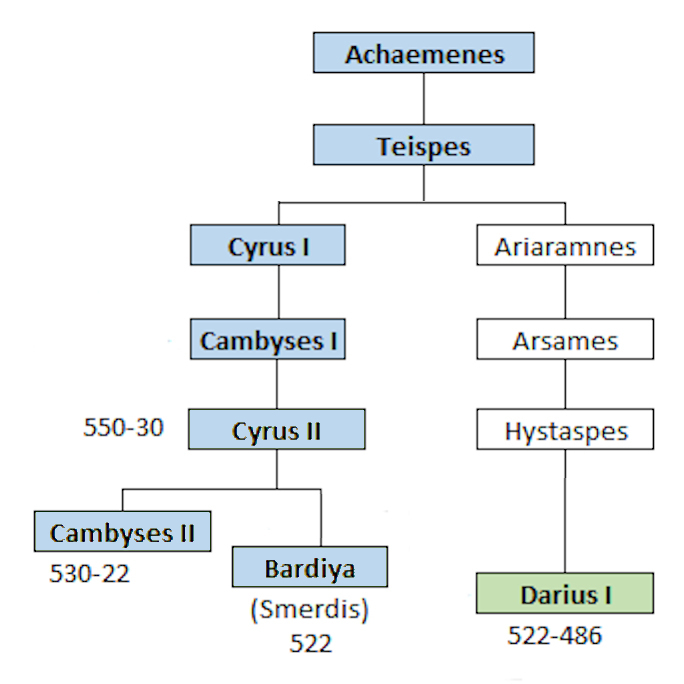
- Position of Teispes in the Achaemenid lineage according to Darius the Great in the Behistun inscription.

King of Persia
- Reign: 675–640 BC
- Predecessor: Achaemenes
- Successor: Cyrus I
- Died: 640 BC
- Issue: Ariaramnes; Cyrus I
- House: Achaemenid (Teispid)
- Father: Achaemenes

Teïspes (from Greek Τεΐσπης, Teispēs; in Old Persian: 𐎨𐎡𐏁𐎱𐎡𐏁 Čišpiš; Akkadian: 𒅆𒅖𒉿𒅖 Šîšpîš, Elamite: Zi-iš-pi-iš) ruled Anshan in 675–640 BC. He was the son of Achaemenes of Persis and an ancestor of Cyrus the Great. There is evidence that Cyrus I and Ariaramnes were both his sons. Cyrus I is the grandfather of Cyrus the Great, whereas Ariaramnes is the great-grandfather of Darius the Great.

According to 7th-century BC documents, Teispes captured the Elamite city of Anshan, speculated to have occurred after the Persians were freed from Median supremacy, and expanded his small kingdom. His kingdom was, however, a vassal state of the Neo-Assyrian Empire (911–605 BC). He was succeeded by his second son, Cyrus I.

== Name ==
The Old Persian version of the name is Čišpiš; Walther Hinz and Heidemarie Koch interpret it as *Čaišpiš, but this appears to be incorrect. Rüdiger Schmitt considers the name "probably Iranian", whereas Jan Tavernier says it could also be Elamite. In either case, the etymology is unknown. It is probably not related to either the name of the Hurrian storm god Tešup or to the name of the Cimmerian king Teušpa. Its connection with the (Elamite) byname 𒍝𒆜𒉿𒆜𒅆𒅀 Zaišpîšiya is unclear — Hinz believes it represents an adjectival form of the name, *Čaišpišya, but Schmitt prefers the reading *Čašpišya instead and says the two names are unrelated.

Vasily Abayev proposed that Čišpiš represents an Iranian form of the Old Indian sú-śiśvi, meaning "growing well". János Harmatta suggested a possible relation to the Sogdian čp'yš, meaning "leader". Tavernier, however, does not think either proposal is convincing. Another Iranian derivation proposed by Wojciech Skalmowski is that the name is a compound related to Old Indian cit-, "thought, intelligence", and pi-, "to swell, overflow".

As for Elamite derivations, Tavernier says that no good one has been found. The verb stem piš-, meaning "to renew, restore", is indeed found in some Elamite names, but the first part is hard to explain. Tavernier suggests a possible connection with šišnali, "beautiful", which occurs as šiš in some compounds; an Elamite name *Šišpiš could then mean "renewing the beautiful". However, this would not explain why the name is spelled Zišpiš in Elamite, since šišnali is only ever spelled with a š.

Another person named Čišpiš is also attested in the Persepolis tablets. This person is mentioned in tablets from 503 and 502 BCE as the recipient of various amounts of grain, and is associated with a place in Elam called Zila-Umpan.

== See also ==
- Teispid

== Bibliography ==
- Akbarzadeh, D.; Yahyanezhad, A. (2006). The Behistun Inscriptions (Old Persian Texts) (in Persian). Khaneye-Farhikhtagan-e Honarhaye Sonati. ISBN 964-8499-05-5.
- Kent, Ronald Grubb (2005). Old Persian: Grammar, Text, Glossary (in Persian). translated into Persian by S. Oryan. Pizhūhishkadah-i Zabān va Gūyish bā hamkārī-i Idārah-i Kull-i Umūr-i Farhangī. ISBN 964-421-045-X.
- Schmitt, Rüdiger (1992). "ČIŠPIŠ". Encyclopaedia Iranica. Vol. 5.

Teispes Achaemenid dynasty Born: Unknown Died: 640 BC
Preceded by Achaemenes	King of Anshan; 675–640 BC	Succeeded by Cyrus I
