= Anshan (Persia) =

Ancient city in Iran

Coordinates: 30°00′41″N 52°24′31″E

Tall-i Malyan
- Anshan
- Location within Iran
- Type: settlement
- Periods: Bronze Age, Iron Age
- Location: Fars province, Iran

History
- Built: 4th millennium BC

Site notes
- Excavation dates: 1968–1978, 1999, 2000
- Archaeologists: William Sumner, Kamyar Abdi
- Condition: Ruined
- Owner: Public
- Public access: Yes

Location of Anshan within the Elamite empire. The approximate Bronze Age extension of the Persian Gulf is shown.

Anshan (Elamite cuneiform: 𒀭𒍝𒀭 Anzan; Sumerian: 𒀭𒊓𒀭𒆠 Ansanᴷᴵ, 𒀭𒊭𒀭𒆠 Anšanᴷᴵ) modern Tall-e Malyan (Persian: تل ملیان), also Tall-i Malyan, was an Elamite and ancient Persian city. It was located in the Zagros Mountains in southwestern Iran, approximately 46 kilometres (29 mi) north of Shiraz and 43 kilometres (27 mi) west of Persepolis in the Beyza/Ramjerd plain, in the province of Fars.

It was one of the earliest urban states to exist, and one of the earliest capitals of Elam from the late 4th millennium BC. It fell under the rule of the Persians in the 7th century BC and then became one of the early capitals of Persia.

Most of what is known about Anshan has been discovered through ancient artifacts discovered in archaeological digs at Tall-e Malyan and passages in early Mesopotamian and Elamite texts.

== History ==
Anshan is considered to be the origin of one of the world's oldest known civilizations. It was occupied continuously from before 4000 BC to 1000 BC and was politically tied to the Elamites at Susa, as well as the Mesopotamians. Its exact location was unknown to scholars until 1973 when artifacts, uncovered through archaeological digs at Tall-i Malyan, confirmed its location. Prior to that scholars only knew of it to be somewhere in the central Zagros mountain range.

During the Proto-Elamite period (late fourth millennium BC), it became one of the main cities of the region, thanks to its location on important trade routes. During the 'Banesh period' (3400–2800), at 50 hectares (120 acres), it was 5 times the size of Susa.

The Marv Dasht area, where the highland city of Anshan is located, is a complex of several interconnected valleys and plains. During the mid-late Banesh Period (3100-2800 BC) Anshan also had a walled area of 200 hectares. It also featured a number of subsidiary villages and campsites.

The Elamite city makes an appearance in the early Sumerian epic Enmerkar and the Lord of Aratta as being en route between Uruk and the legendary Aratta, supposedly around the time writing was developed. At various times, Anshan provided, in its own right, the source for a number of Elamite dynasties that sometimes competed for extent and influence with other prominent Elamite cities.

The earliest evidence of Anshan can be found in the Sumerian King List where many references are made to rulers of Awan. Manishtushu claimed to have subjugated Anshan, but as the Akkadian Empire weakened under his successors, the native governor of Susa, Kutik-Inshushinak, a scion of the Awan dynasty, proclaimed his independence from Akkad and captured Anshan. Following this, Gudea of Lagash claimed to have subjugated Anshan in 2200 BC and the Neo-Sumerian rulers Shulgi and Shu-Sin of Ur are said to have maintained their own governors over the place. However their successor, Ibbi-Sin, seems to have spent his reign engaged in a losing struggle to maintain control over Anshan, ultimately resulting in the Elamite sack of Ur in 2004 BC, at which time the statue of Nanna, and Ibbi-Sin himself, were captured and removed to Anshan. In the Old Babylonian period, king Gungunum of Larsa dated his 5th regnal year after the destruction of Anshan.

During the early Elamite period, the rulers were known as the kings of Awan, but later on, they are referred to as the kings of Anzan, Susa, and Elam. There is also evidence that suggests Awan may have been a political district that was a part of a larger Anshan. Particularly since it has been discovered that Anshan was politically and culturally advanced. From the 15th century BC, Elamite rulers at Susa began using the title "King of Anshan and Susa" (in Akkadian texts, the toponyms are reversed, as "King of Susa and Anshan"), and it seems probable that Anshan and Susa were in fact unified for much of the "Middle Elamite period". The last king to claim this title was Shutruk-Nahhunte II (ca. 717-699 BC).

Anshan fell under Persis Achaemenid rule in the 7th century BC, having been captured by Teispes (675–640 BC), who was an ancestor of Cyrus the Great and styled himself "the great king, king of Anshan". For another century during the period of Elamite decline, Anshan was a minor kingdom, until the Achaemenids in the 6th century BC embarked on a series of conquests from Anshan, which became the nucleus of the Persian Empire. The most famous conqueror who rose from Anshan was Cyrus the Great.

Evidence of the connection to the Achaemenid Empire can be linked through writings on the Cyrus Cylinder which trace the lineage of Cyrus the Great. Cyrus is referred to as the "king of the city of Anshan" and his ancestors as "the great king, king of the city of Anshan"

== Archaeology ==
The site of Anshan covers around 200 hectares. The main feature is a low flat-topped mound of about 130 hectares running 4–6 metres (13–20 ft) in height. On three sides are the remains of a city wall, 5 kilometres (3.1 mi) in length and 20 meters wide, which dates from the Late Banesh and Kaftari periods. A small site about 300 meters northeast from the main mound was termed the TUV Mound by the excavators. This area was only occupied during the Banesh phase of the late fourth millennium BC when it covered 3 hectares and the main site had an area of about 50 hectares. Proto-Elamite tablets were found at TUV at the same level as in the main mound. Beveled rim bowls were also found at TUV.

The site was first worked by Hassan Nader and Fereidoon Tavallali of the Archaeological Service of Iran in 1961. No records or publications of that effort appear to exist, though some artifacts ended up in the Persepolis Museum.

Scientific excavation began in 1971 with a team, led by William Sumner, from the University of Pennsylvania and Ohio State University after a survey in 1968. The dig continued for several seasons, until 1978, when the Iranian revolution intervened. Most recently, Tal-i Malyan was excavated by Kamyar Abdi in 1999. Abdi returned for a further six week dig in 2004 by the Cultural Heritage Organization of Iran and Dartmouth College.

The most notable find was that of an inscribed brick found at an unspecified location at the site in 1971. A photograph was published in a French archaeological publication which contained inscriptions from this brick that were key to identifying the lost city of Anshan These inscriptions were written in Elamite and believed to be part of a temple built by the Elamite kings to honor the gods at Anshan. The inscription contained the name of the Elamite ruler Hutelutush-Inshushinak and his sons and daughters. After translating a group of tablets that were found at the site the following season, Erica Reiner, from the University of Chicago's Oriental Institute, was able to match these writings to those on the brick. They also matched the writings on tablets discovered by the Pennsylvania team which did, specifically, name Anshan. In 1973, it was confirmed that this site was the lost city of Anshan.

Three separate groups of tablets were found by the Pennsylvania team at the site. The oldest group contains 33 tablets and fragments made of unbaked clay that date back to the third millennium BC (in Level III). Some were found in excavation area ABC in the main mound in a monumental building structures with the rest in smaller structures in Operation TUV. That set of tablets has not been translated because the writing is Proto-Elamite.

The next set of tablets are inscribed in Cuneiform, in the Old Babylonian variant of the Akkadian language, and date back to the Old Babylonian period c. 1800 BC. These tablets signify a Mesopotamian influence. The third set of tablets (in Level II), in Elamite cuneiform, are the ones used by Erica Reiner to positively identify Anshan's location. They date from the later part of the Middle Elamite Period and are mostly part of an archive. The building containing the tablets was destroyed by fire which baked the tablets but in collapsing damaged a number of them. About 50 tablets are complete.

An agreement was made between the researchers and the Iranian government that the Iranian government could choose ten artifacts and the remaining items would be divided between evenly between the two parties. The Iranian government chose to take several of the tablets in their choice of the original ten items.

== See also ==
- Prehistory of Iran
- List of cities of the ancient Near East
- Chronology of the ancient Near East
- History of Iran
- Cyrus the Great
- List of monarchs of Iran
- List of Elamite kings
