= Pharnaces =

Pharnaces (Greek: Φαρνάκης) may refer to:

- Pharnaces (fl. 550 BCE – 497 BCE), founder of the Pharnacid dynasty of satraps of Hellespontine Phrygia
- Pharnaces II of Phrygia (fl. 430 BCE – 413 BCE), satrap of Hellespontine Phrygia
- Pharnaces (Persian noble) (died 334 BCE), Persian commander in the battle of the Granicus
- Pharnaces I of Pontus (fl. 2nd century BCE), first important ruler of the kingdom of Pontus
- Pharnaces II of Pontus (died 47 BCE), the son of Mithridates VI of Pontus, he tried to reconquer Pontus, but was crushed by Julius Caesar
