= Bagaeus =

Late 6th century Achaemenid nobleman

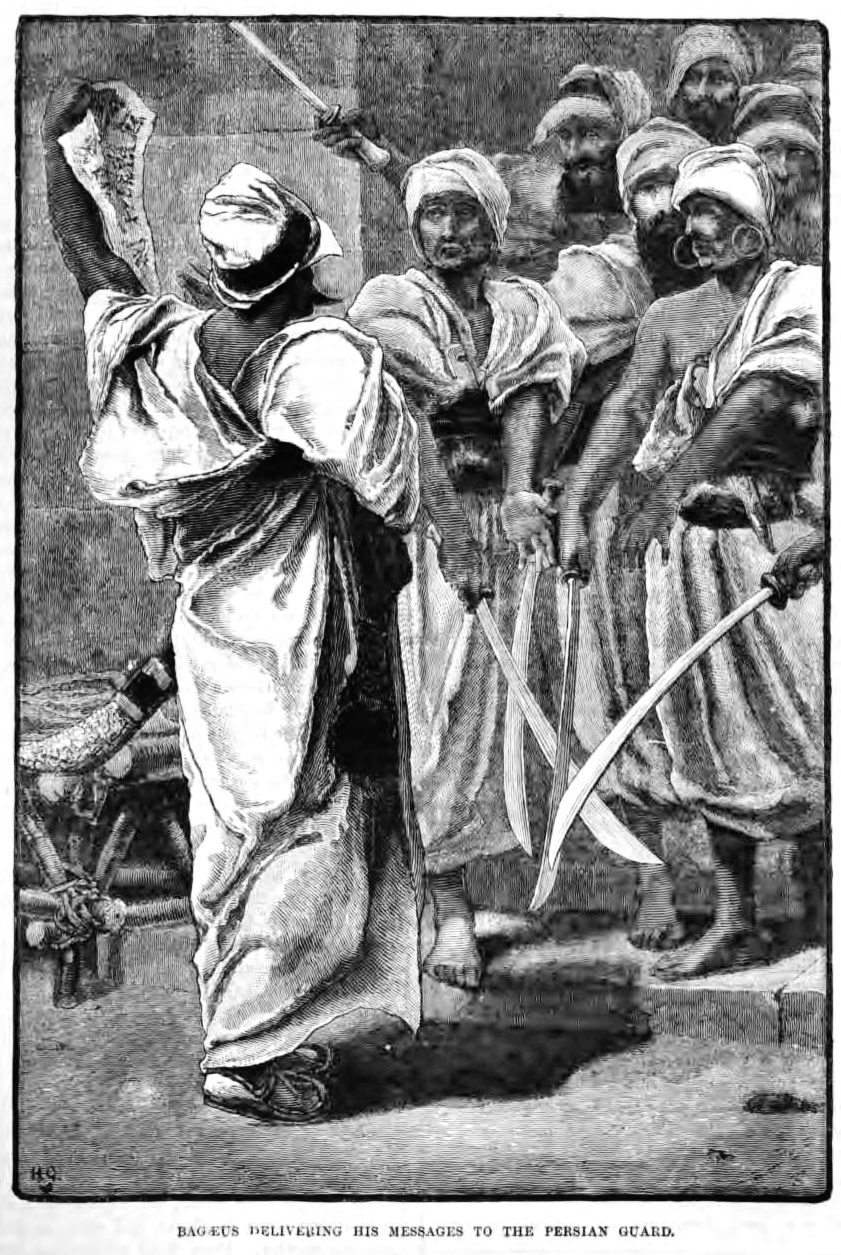
Bagaeus delivering his messages to the Persian guards. 19th century illustration.

Bagaeus (Old Iranian: Bagaya) (fl. circa 520-517 BCE), son of Artontes, was an Achaemenid nobleman, who was ordered by Darius I to kill the rebellious satrap of Lydia, Oroetes. Oroetes was accused of having killed Mitrobates, the satrap of Daskyleion (Hellespontine Phrygia) and his son, but is best known as the murderer of Polycrates of Samos. Herodotus recounts how Bagaeus used written orders from Darius in order to assure himself of the obedience of the bodyguards of Oroetes to the orders of Darius, and when assured, produced a final order to kill Oroetes:

So when Darius became king, he wanted to punish Oroetes for all his wrongdoing, and especially for killing Mitrobates and his son. But he thought it best not to send an army openly against the satrap, seeing that everything was still in confusion and he was still new to the royal power; moreover he heard that Oroetes was very powerful, having a guard of a thousand Persian spearmen and being governor of the Phrygian and Lydian and Ionian province. He had recourse, then, to the following expedient: having summoned an assembly of the most prominent Persians, he addressed them as follows: “Persians, which of you will promise to do this for me, not with force and numbers, but by cunning? Where there is need for cunning, force has no business. So then, which of you would either bring me Oroetes alive or kill him? For he has done the Persians no good, but much harm; he has destroyed two of us, Mitrobates and his son, and is killing my messengers that are sent to recall him, displaying an insolence that is not to be borne. So, then, before he does the Persians some still greater harm, he has to be punished by us with death.” Darius asked this and thirty men promised, each wanting to do it himself. Darius told them not argue but draw lots; they did, and the lot fell to Bagaeus, son of Artontes. Bagaeus, having drawn the lot, did as follows: he had many letters written concerning many things and put the seal of Darius on them, and then went with them to Sardis.

— Herodotus 3.127-128.

Bagaeus then went to the court of Oroetes in Sardis, Lydia, and produced the letters one by one:

When he got there and came into Oroetes' presence, he took out each letter in turn and gave it to one of the royal scribes to read (all of the governors of the King have scribes); Bagaeus gave the letters to test the spearmen, whether they would consent to revolt against Oroetes. Seeing that they were greatly affected by the rolls and yet more by what was written in them, he gave another, in which were these words: “Persians! King Darius forbids you to be Oroetes' guard.” Hearing this, they lowered their spears for him. When Bagaeus saw that they obeyed the letter so far, he was encouraged and gave the last roll to the scribe, in which was written: “King Darius instructs the Persians in Sardis to kill Oroetes.” Hearing this the spearmen drew their scimitars and killed him at once. Thus atonement for Polycrates the Samian overtook Oroetes the Persian.

— Herodotus 3.127-128.

It is thought that Bagaeus may have become the new satrap for a short time after this assassination.
