= Pharnabazus II =

Persian satrap of Hellespontine Phrygia from 413 to 374 BC

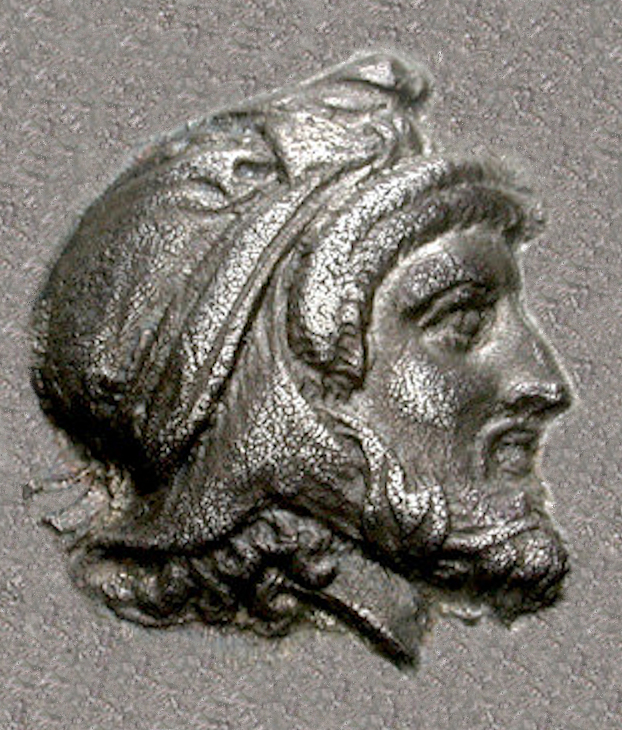
- Portrait of Pharnabazus II on his coinage.

Satrap of Hellespontine Phrygia
- In office 413 BC – 387 BC
- Preceded by: Pharnaces II
- Succeeded by: Ariobarzanes of Phrygia

Personal details
- Spouse(s): Apama, daughter of Artaxerxes II of Persia
- Children: Artabazos II
- Parent: Pharnaces II of Phrygia

Military service
- Allegiance: Achaemenid Empire
- Battles/wars: Peloponnesian War; Battle of Cyzicus; Corinthian War; Battle of Cnidus

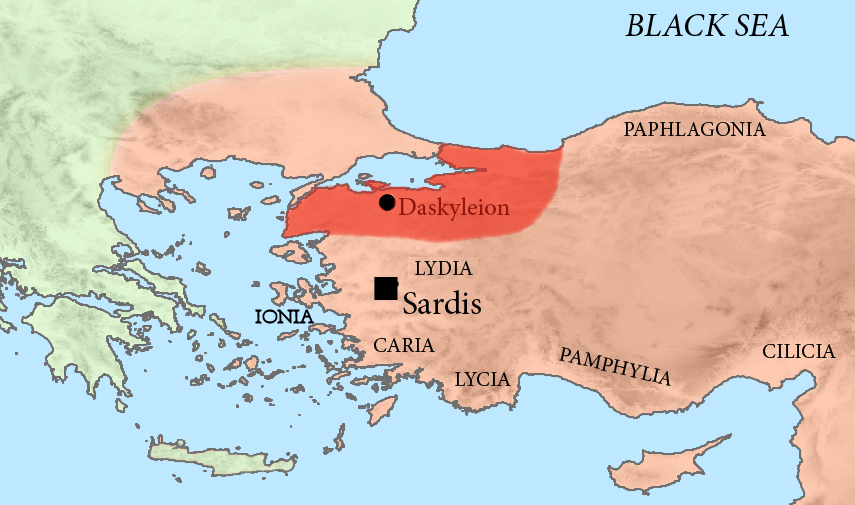
Pharnabazus was Satrap of Hellespontine Phrygia.

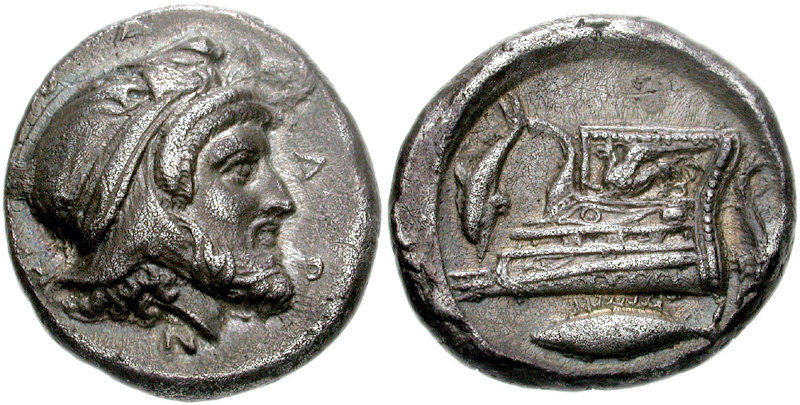
Coinage of Pharnabazos, circa 398-396/5 BC, Kyzikos, Mysia. Obv: Legend ΦΑΡ-Ν-[A]-BA ("FAR-N-[A]-BA", for Pharnabazos), head of Pharnabazos, wearing the satrapal cap tied below his chin, with diadem. Rev: Ship's prow left, with a griffin and prophylactic eye; two dolphins downward; below, a tuna.

Pharnabazus II (Old Iranian: Farnabāzu, Ancient Greek: Φαρνάβαζος Pharnabazos; ruled 413–374 BC) was a Persian soldier and statesman, and Satrap of Hellespontine Phrygia. He was the son of Pharnaces II of Phrygia and grandson of Pharnabazus I, and great-grandson of Artabazus I. He and his male ancestors, forming the Pharnacid dynasty, had governed the satrapy of Hellespontine Phrygia from its headquarters at Dascylium since 478 BC. He married Apama, daughter of Artaxerxes II of Persia, and their son Artabazus also became a satrap of Phrygia. According to some accounts, his granddaughter Barsine may have become Alexander the Great's concubine.

According to research by Theodor Nöldeke, he was descended from Otanes, one of the associates of Darius in the murder of Smerdis.

== Satrap of Hellespontine Phrygia ==
=== War with Sparta against Athens (c. 430–404 BC) ===
Athens was the dominant power in the Aegean in the 5th century BC, following the Greeks' victories over the Achaemenids in the Second Persian invasion of Greece (480–479 BC). Athens, powered by the alliance formed under the Delian League, has even been called the Athenian Empire at that time, and formed the largest threat to the Achaemenid possessions in Asia Minor.

Pharnabazus II was first recorded as satrap of Hellespontine Phrygia in 413 BC, when he received orders from Darius II of Persia to send in the outstanding tribute of the Greek cities on the Ionian coast, tribute he had a hard time to obtain due to Athenian interference. Thucydides described this situation, faced by both satraps Pharnabazus and Tissaphernes:

The king (Darius II) had lately called upon him for the tribute from his government, for which he was in arrears, being unable to raise it from the Hellenic towns by reason of the Athenians; and he therefore calculated that by weakening the Athenians he should get the tribute better paid, and should also draw the Lacedaemonians into alliance with the king.

— Thucydides, The Peloponnesian War 8.5.5&6

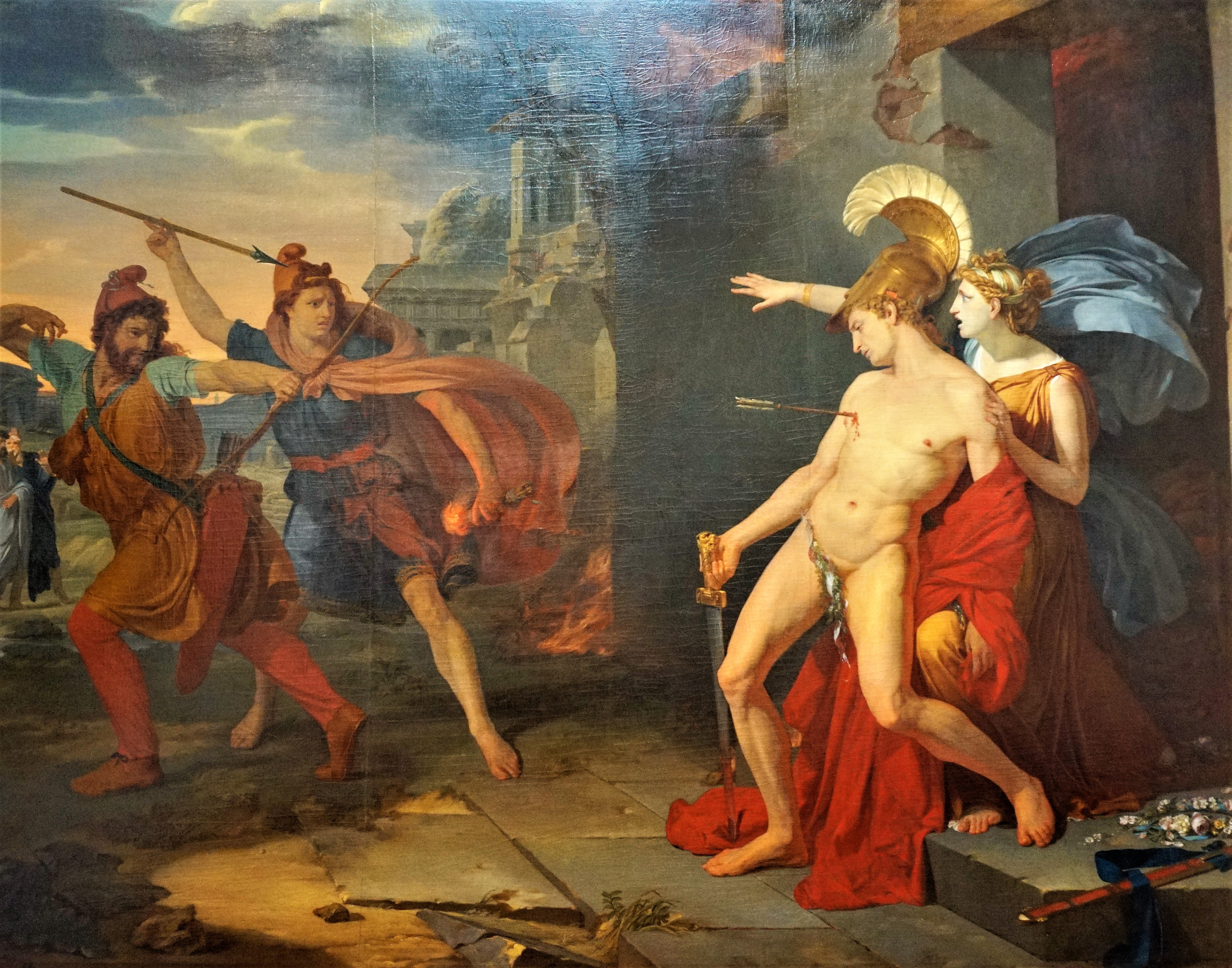
The assassination of the exiled Athenian general Alcibiades may have been organized by Pharnabazes, at the request of Sparta.

He, like Tissaphernes of Caria, entered into negotiations with Sparta and began a war with Athens. The conduct of the war was much hindered by the rivalry between the two satraps, of whom Pharnabazus was by far the more energetic and upright. Pharnabazus initially fought with the Spartans against the Athenians during the Peloponnesian War (431–404 BC), even, in one instance, coming to the rescue of the retreating Spartan forces, and riding his horse into the sea to fend off the Athenians while encouraging his regiment.

In 404 BC, Pharnabazus may also have been responsible for the assassination of the Athenian general Alcibiades, who had taken refuge in the Achaemenid Empire. The assassination was probably at the instigation of the Spartans, and specifically Lysander. As Alcibiades was about to set out for the Persian court, his residence was surrounded and set on fire. Seeing no chance of escape he rushed out on his assassins, dagger in hand, and was killed by a shower of arrows.

==== Conflict with the Ten Thousand (399 BC) ====
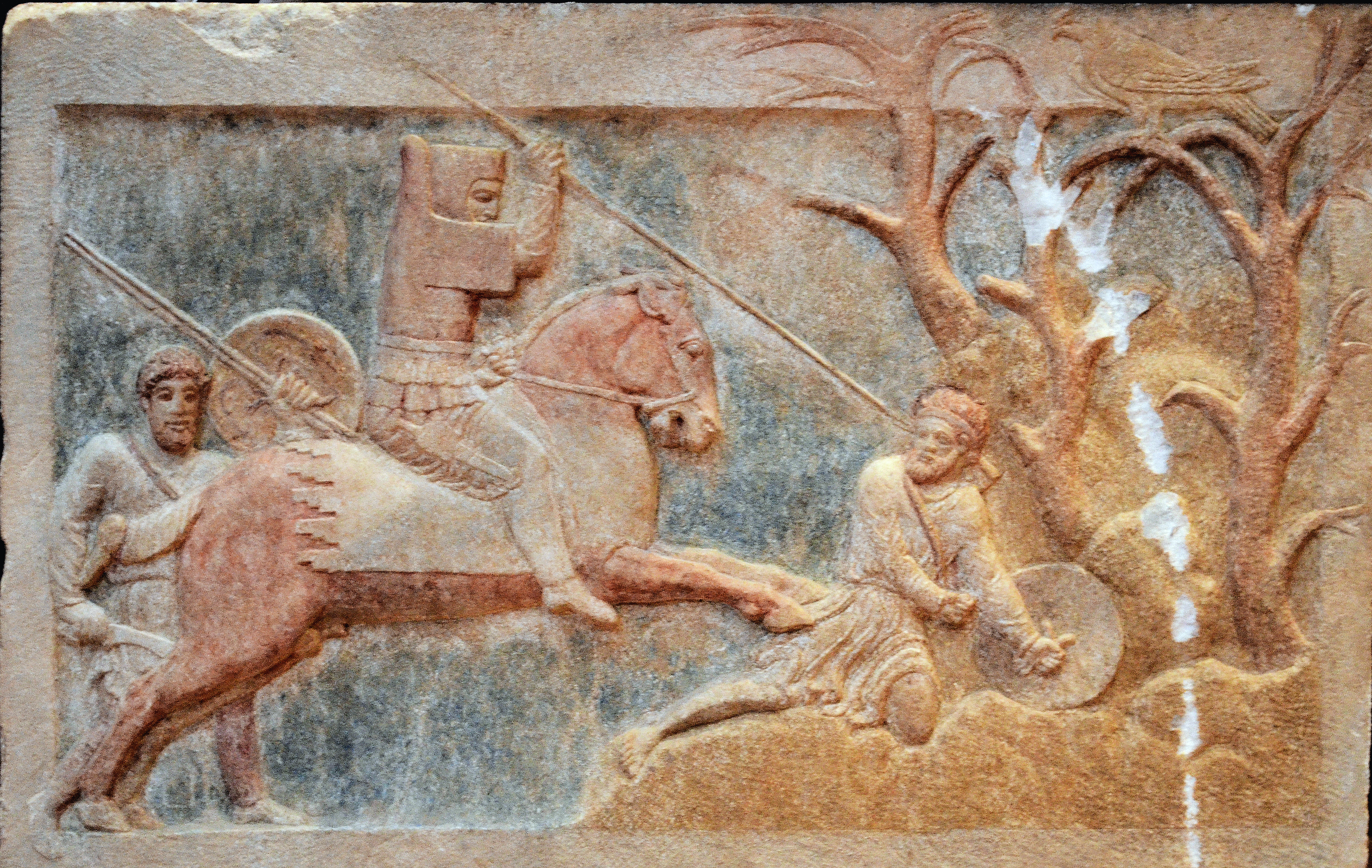
An Athenian mercenary peltast (left) supporting an Achaemenid knight of Hellespontine Phrygia (center) attacking a Greek psilos (right), Altıkulaç Sarcophagus, early 4th century BCE.

After their victory in the Peloponnesian War (431–404 BC), the Spartans became the dominant power in the Aegean, creating a new threat for the Achaemenid Empire. The Spartans then antagonised the Achaemenid king Artaxerxes II by militarily supporting the rival bid of his brother Cyrus the Younger, their ally during the Peloponnesian war, leading to the campaign of the Ten Thousand deep into Achaemenid territory in 401-399 BC. Cyrus the Younger failed, but the relationship between Sparta and the Achaemenid Empire remained adversarial.

Pharnabazus was involved in helping the Bithynians against the plundering raids of the Greek Ten Thousand who were returning from their failed campaign in the centre of the Achaemenid Empire. He was also trying to stop them from entering Hellespontine Phrygia. His cavalry is said to have killed about 500 Greek mercenaries on that occasion, and mounted several raids on the Greek mercenaries. Pharnabazus then arranged with the Spartan admiral Anaxibius for the rest of the Greek mercenaries to be shipped out of the Asian continent to Byzantium.

=== War with Athens against Sparta (395–387 BC) ===
==== Conflict with Spartan King Agesilaos in Asia Minor ====
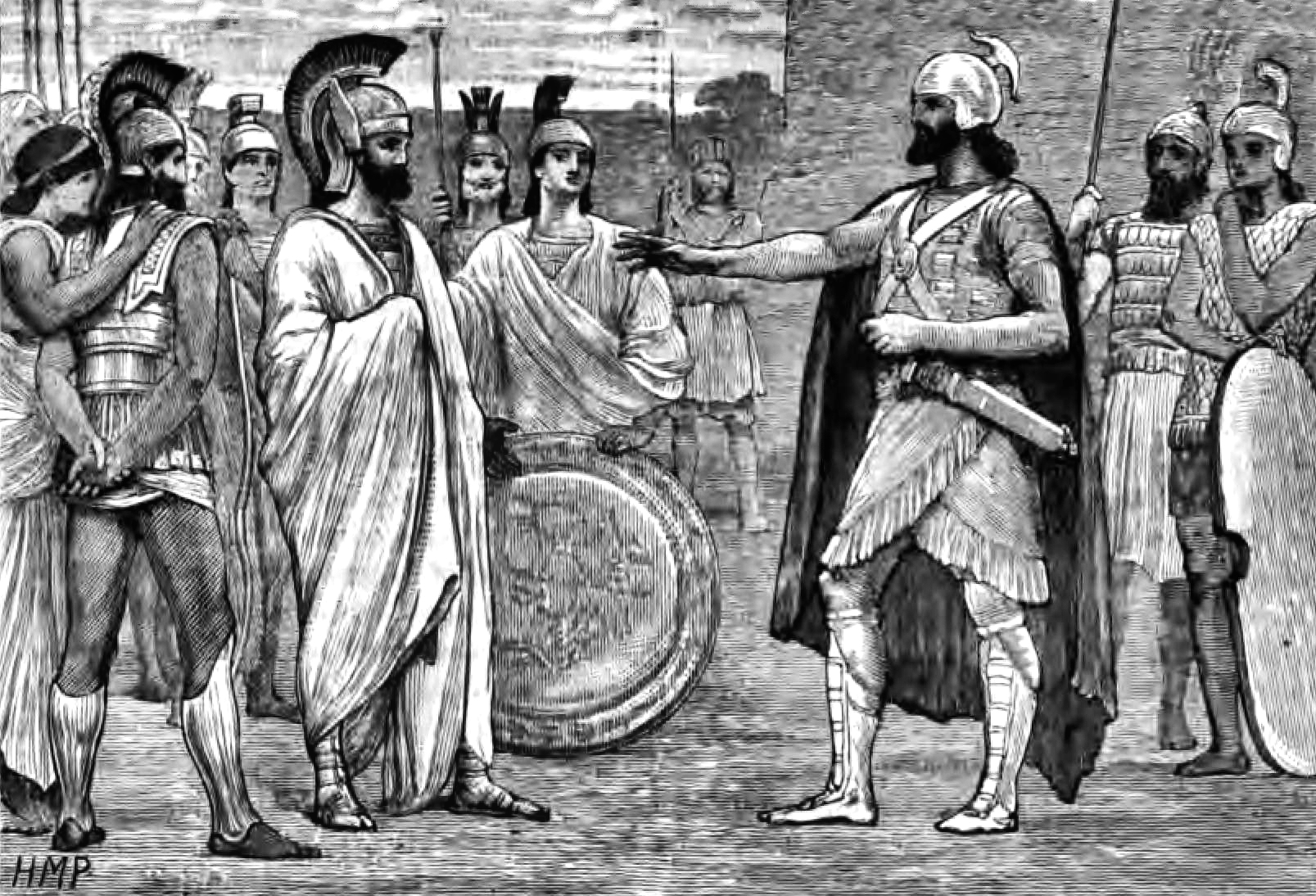
Meeting between Spartan King Agesilaus (left) and Pharnabazus (right) in 395 BC, after which Agesilaus left Hellespontine Phrygia proper.

Hellespontine Phrygia was attacked and ravaged by the Spartan king Agesilaos in 396-395 BC, who particularly laid waste to the area around Daskyleion, the capital of Hellenistic Phrygia. Pharnabazus had several military encounters against the invading Spartans on this occasion. Pharnabazus finally met in person with Agesilaos, and Agesilaos agreed to remove himself from Hellespontine Phrygia proper and retreated to the plain of Thebe in the Troad.

In 394, while encamped on the plain of Thebe, Agesilaus was still planning a campaign in the interior of Asia Minor, or even an attack on Artaxerxes II himself, when he was recalled to Greece to fight in the Corinthian War between Sparta and the combined forces of Athens, Thebes, Corinth, Argos and several minor states.

The outbreak of the conflict in Greece had been encouraged by Persian payments to Sparta's Greek rivals, and had for effect to remove the Spartan threat in Asia Minor. Pharnabazus sent Timocrates of Rhodes as an envoy to Greece, and tens of thousands of Darics, the main currency in Achaemenid coinage, were used to bribe the Greek states to start a war against Sparta. According to Plutarch, Agesilaus said upon leaving Asia Minor "I have been driven out by 10,000 Persian archers", a reference to "Archers" (Toxotai) the Greek nickname for the Darics from their obverse design, because that much money had been paid to politicians in Athens and Thebes in order to start a war against Sparta.

==== Participation to the Corinthian War on the side of Athens (395-393 BC) ====
Pharnabazes went on to aid the Athenians against the Spartans in the Corinthian War (394–387 BC). During this period, Pharnabazus is notable for his command of the Achaemenid fleet at the Battle of Cnidus (394 BC) in which the Persians, allied with the former Athenian admiral and then commissioned into Persian service, Conon, annihilated the Spartan fleet, ending Sparta's brief status as the dominant Greek naval power.

===== Naval raids in Ionia =====
Pharnabazus followed up his victory at Cnidus by capturing several Spartan-allied cities in Ionia, instigating pro-Athenian and pro-Democracy movements. Abydus and Sestus were the only cities to refuse to expel the Lacedaemonians despite threats from Pharnabazus to make war on them. He attempted to force these into submission by ravaging the surrounding territory, but this proved fruitless, leading him to leave Conon in charge of winning over the cities in the Hellespont.

===== Naval raids on the Peloponnesian coast =====
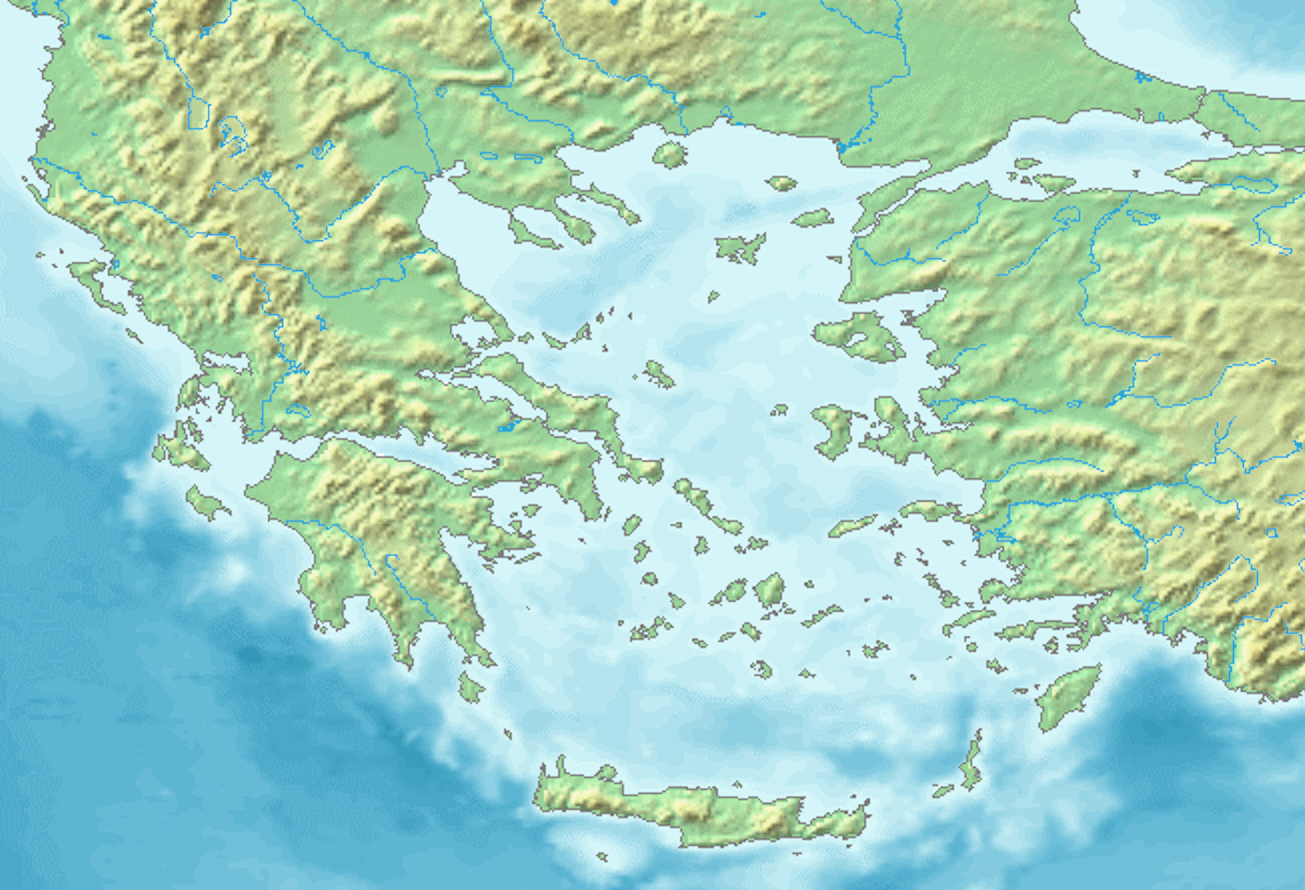
Achaemenid naval campaign against Sparta in the Corinthian War (394-393 BC)

From 393 BC, Pharnabazus II and Conon sailed with his fleet to the Aegean island of Melos and established a base there. This was the first time in 90 years, since the Greco-Persian Wars, that the Achaemenid fleet was going so far west. The military occupation by these pro-Athenian forces led to several democratic revolutions and new alliances with Athens in the islands.

The fleet proceeded further west to take revenge on the Spartans by invading Lacedaemonian territory, where the Achaemenids laid waste to Pherae and raided along the Messenian coast. Their aim was probably to instigate a revolt of the Messanian helots against Sparta. Eventually they left due to scarce resources and few harbors for the Achaemenid fleet in the area, as well as the looming possibility of Lacedaemonian relief forces being dispatched.

They then raided the coast of Laconia and seized the island of Cythera, where they left a garrison and an Athenian governor to cripple Sparta's offensive military capabilities. Cythera in effect became Achaemenid territory. Seizing Cythera also had the effect of cutting the strategic route between Peloponnesia and Egypt and thus avoiding Spartan-Egyptian collusion, and directly threatening Taenarum, the harbour of Sparta. This strategy to threaten Sparta had already been recommended, in vain, by the exiled Spartan Demaratus to Xerxes I in 480 BC.

Pharnabazus II, leaving part of his fleet in Cythera, then went to Corinth, where he gave Sparta's rivals funds to further threaten the Lacedaemonians. He also funded the rebuilding of a Corinthian fleet to resist the Spartans.

Xenophon gave a detailed contemporary account of the naval campaign of Pharnabazus in his Hellenica:

Pharnabazus, and Conon with him, sailed through the islands to Melos, and making that their base, went on to Lacedaemon. And first Pharnabazus put in at Pherae and laid waste this region; then he made descents at one point and another of the coast and did whatever harm he could. But being fearful because the country was destitute of harbours, because the Lacedaemonians might send relief forces, and because provisions were scarce in the land, he quickly turned about, and sailing away, came to anchor at Phoenicus in the island of Cythera. And when those who held possession of the city of the Cytherians abandoned their walls through fear of being captured by storm, he allowed them to depart to Laconia under a truce, and having repaired the wall of the Cytherians, left in Cythera a garrison of his own and Nicophemus, an Athenian, as governor. After doing these things and sailing to the Isthmus of Corinth and there exhorting the allies to carry on the war zealously and show themselves men faithful to the King, he left them all the money that he had and sailed off homeward. (...) The Corinthians, on the other hand, manned ships with the money which Pharnabazus left, appointed Agathinus as admiral, and established their mastery of the sea in the gulf around Achaea and Lechaeum.

— Xenophon Hellenica 4.8.7 to 4.8.10

===== Rebuilding of the walls of Athens =====
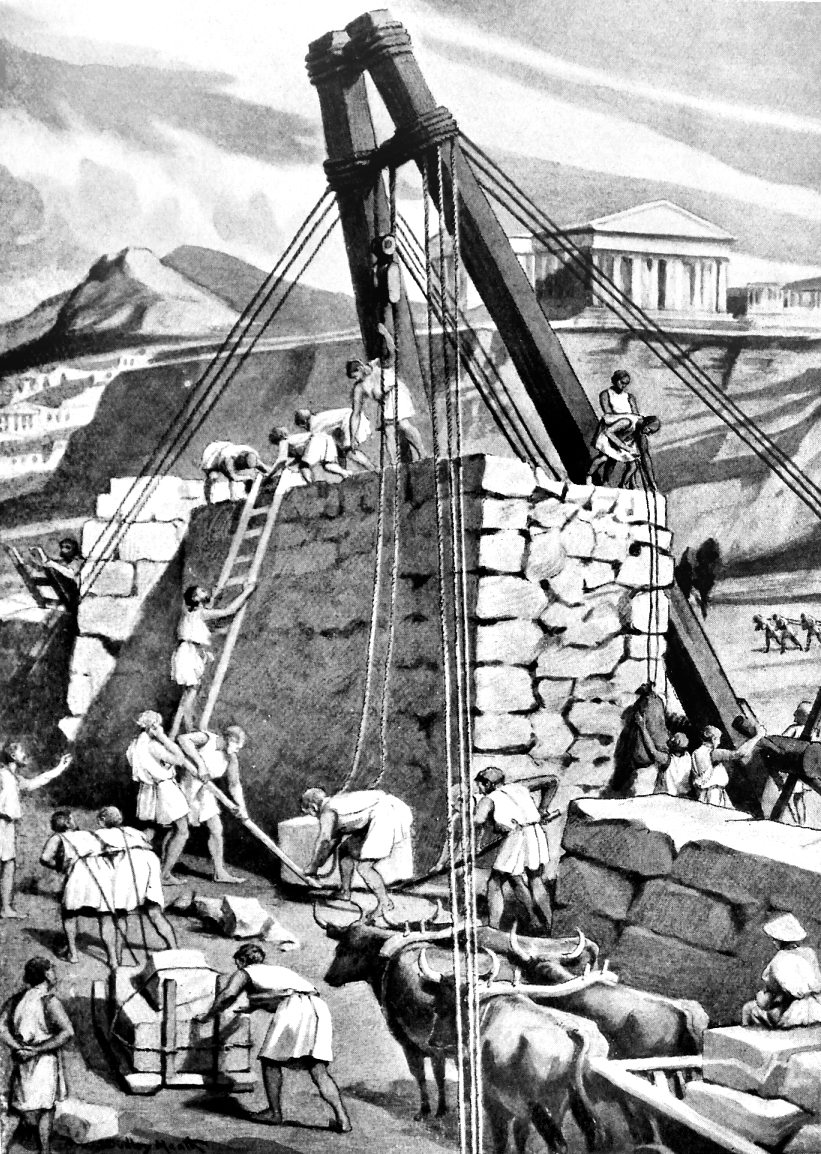
Pharnabazus funded the rebuilding the walls of Athens, and provided his seamen as manpower, in 393 BC.

After being convinced by Conon that allowing him to rebuild the Long Walls around Piraeus, the main port of Athens, would be a major blow to the Lacedaemonians, Pharnabazus eagerly gave Conon a fleet of 80 triremes and additional funds to accomplish this task. Pharnabazus dispatched Conon with substantial funds and a large part of the fleet to Attica, where he joined in the rebuilding of the long walls from Athens to Piraeus, a project that had been initiated by Thrasybulus in 394 BC.

According to Xenophon in Hellenica:

Conon said that if he (Pharnabazus) would allow him to have the fleet, he would maintain it by contributions from the islands and would meanwhile put in at Athens and aid the Athenians in rebuilding their long walls and the wall around Piraeus, adding that he knew nothing could be a heavier blow to the Lacedaemonians than this. (...) Pharnabazus, upon hearing this, eagerly dispatched him to Athens and gave him additional money for the rebuilding of the walls. Upon his arrival Conon erected a large part of the wall, giving his own crews for the work, paying the wages of carpenters and masons, and meeting whatever other expense was necessary. There were some parts of the wall, however, which the Athenians themselves, as well as volunteers from Boeotia and from other states, aided in building.

— Xenophon Hellenica 4.8.7 4.8.8

With the assistance of the rowers of the fleet, and the workers paid for by the Persian money, the construction was soon completed. Athens quickly took advantage of its possession of walls and a fleet to seize the islands of Scyros, Imbros, and Lemnos, on which it established cleruchies (citizen colonies).

As a reward for his success, Pharnabazus was allowed to marry the king's daughter, Apame. He was recalled to the Achaemenid Empire in 393 BC, and replaced by satrap Tiribazus.

=== Final settlement with Sparta (386 BC) ===
In 386 BC, Artaxerxes II betrayed his Athenian allies and came to an arrangement with Sparta, to the expense of the Greek cities of Asia Minor, which Sparta agreed to concede to the Achaemenids in exchange for Spartan domination in Greece. In the Treaty of Antalcidas he forced his erstwhile allies to come to terms. This treaty restored control of the Greek cities of Ionia and Aeolis on the Anatolian coast to the Persians, while giving Sparta dominance on the Greek mainland.

== Campaign against Egypt (373 BC) ==
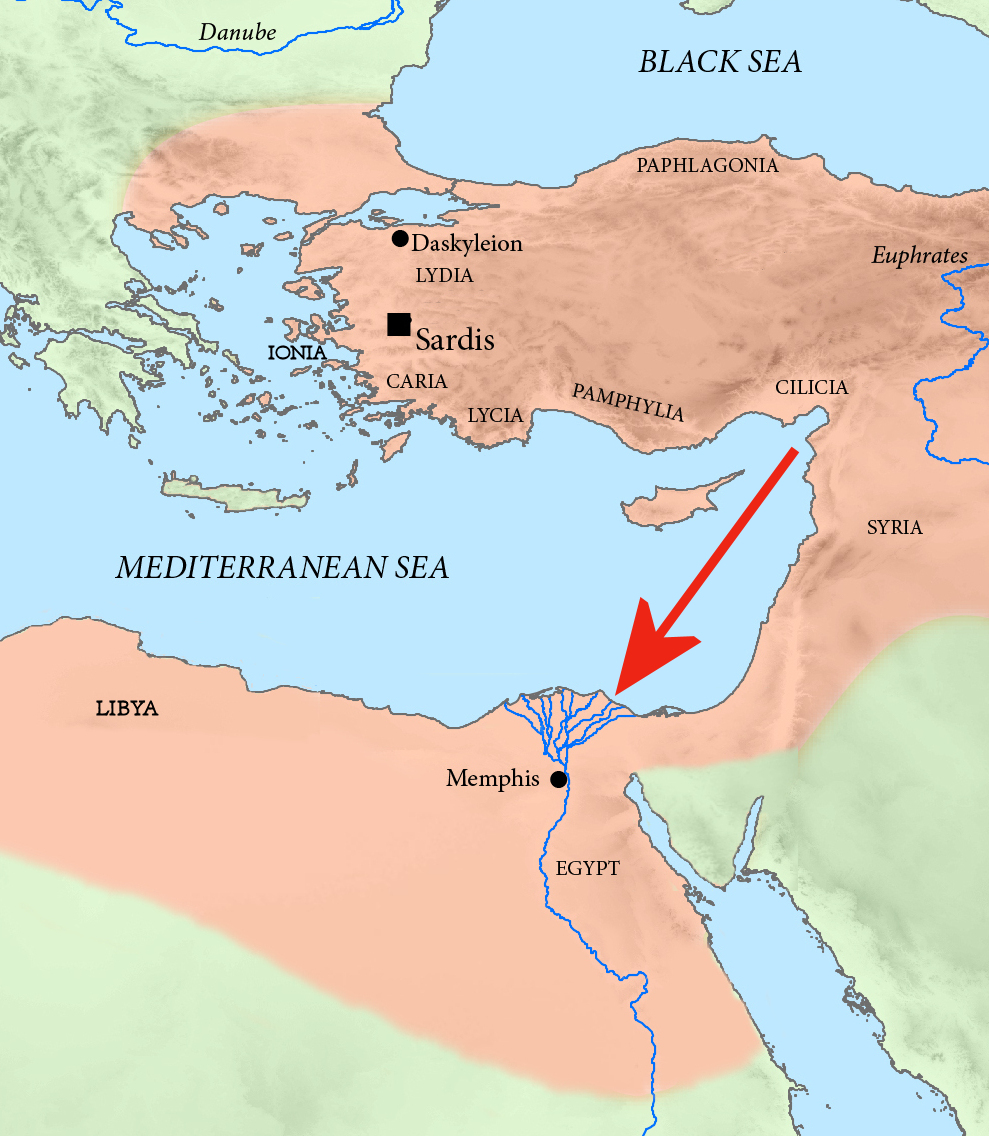
Achaemenid campaign of Pharnabazus II against Egypt in 373 BC.

In 377 BC, Pharnabazus was then reassigned by Artaxerxes II to help command a military expedition into rebellious Egypt, having proven his ability against the Spartans.

After 4 years of preparations in the Levant, Pharnabazes gathered an expeditionary force had 200,000 Persian troops, 300 triremes, 200 galleys, and 12,000 Greeks under Iphicrates. The Achaemenid Empire had also been applying pressure on Athens to recall the Greek general Chabrias, who was in the service of the Egyptians, but in vain. The Egyptian ruler Nectanebo I was thus supported by Athenian General Chabrias and his mercenaries.

=== Expedition ===
The force landed in Egypt with the Athenian general Iphicrates near Mendes in 373 BC. The expedition force was too slow, giving time to the Egyptians to strengthen defences. Pharnabazus and Iphicrates appeared before Pelusium, but retired without attacking it, Nectanebo I, king of Egypt, having added to its former defences by laying the neighbouring lands under water, and blocking up the navigable channels of the Nile by embankments. (Diodorus Siculus xv. 42; Cornelius Nepos, Iphicrates c. 5.) Fortifications on the Pelusiac branch of the Nile ordered by Nectanebo forced the enemy fleet to seek another way to sail up the Nile. Eventually the fleet managed to find its way up the less-defended Mendesian branch. At this point, the mutual distrust that had arisen between Iphicrates and Pharnabazus prevented the enemy from reaching Memphis. Then the annual Nile flood and the Egyptian defenders' resolve to defend their territory turned what had initially appeared as certain defeat for Nectanebo I and his troops into a complete victory.

After several weeks the Persians, and their Greek mercenaries under Iphicrates, had to re-embark. The expedition against Egypt had failed. It was the end of the career of Pharnabazus, who was now over 70 years old. Pharnabazus was replaced by Datames to lead a second expedition to Egypt, but he failed and then started the "Satraps' Revolt" against the Great King.

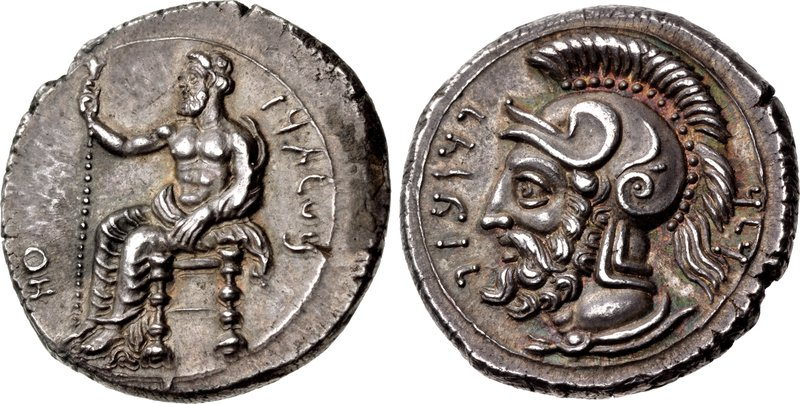
Coinage of Pharnabazus II, Tarsos, Cilicia.

From 368 BC many western satrapies of the Achaemenid Empire started to rebel against Artaxerxes II, in the Great Satraps' Revolt, so Nectanebo provided financial support to the rebelling satraps and re-established ties with both Sparta and Athens.

=== Coinage ===
A large number of coins have been found from that period, presumably in order to pay for the troops, particularly for the Greek troops under Iphicrates. The large coinage was minted in Tarsos, Cilicia. The coins use images of the god of war Ares wearing an Attic helmet, or a seated Baal.

== Pharnabazus in Greek literature ==
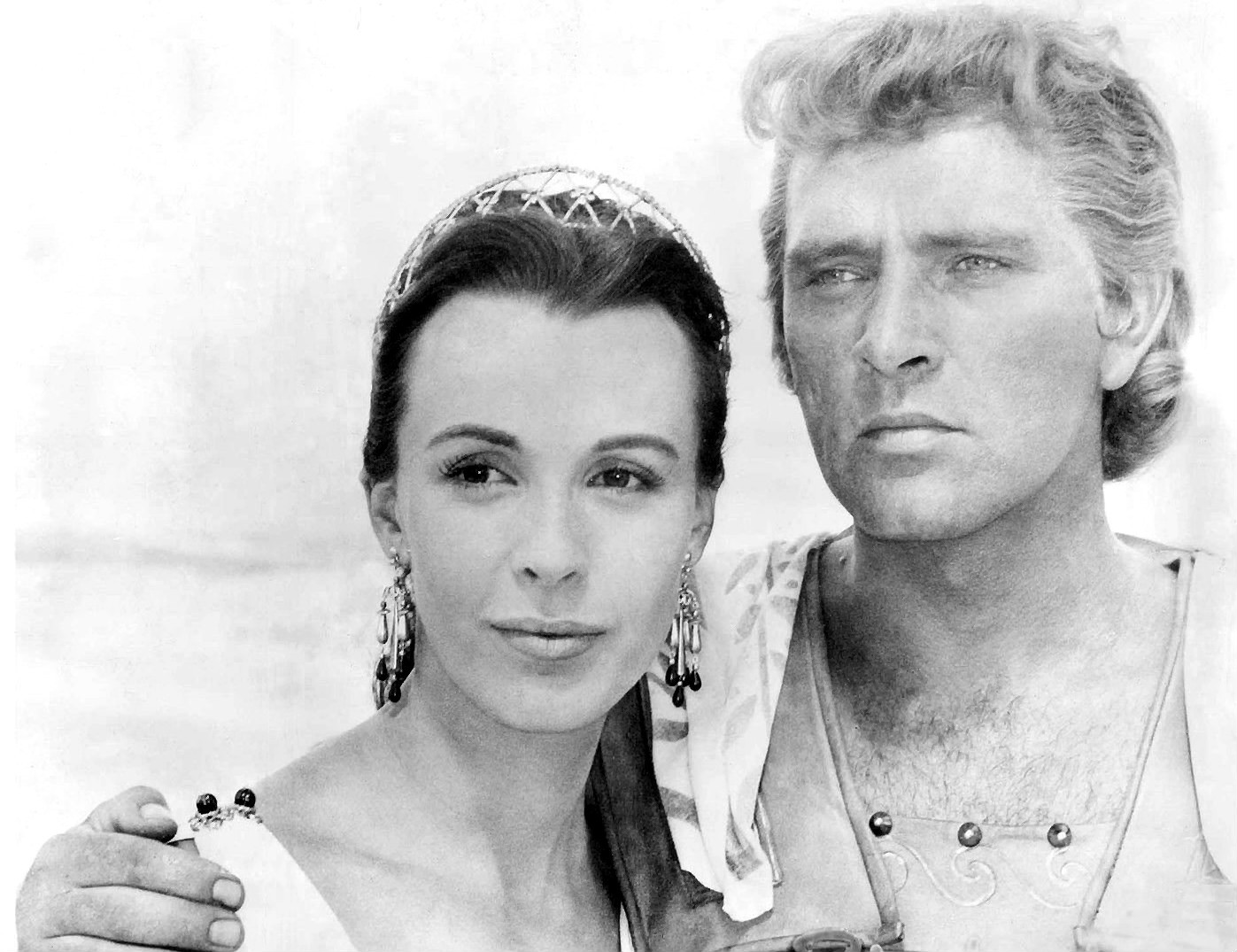
Claire Bloom as Barsine, granddaughter of Pharnabazus, and Richard Burton as Alexander the Great, in Alexander the Great (1956 film).

Pharnabazus was one of the best known Satraps among the Greeks, and had many exchanges with them. He is one of the main characters in the Hellenica of Xenophon, also appears in his Anabasis, and is also very present in the History of the Peloponnesian War of Thucydides.

The family of Pharnabazus was closely related to the Greek world. His son Artabazos II married a Greek noblewoman from Rhodes, and lived in exile with his family at the Macedonian court of Philip II for more than ten years. His granddaughter Barsine may have been Alexander the Great's concubine and may have had a child by him.

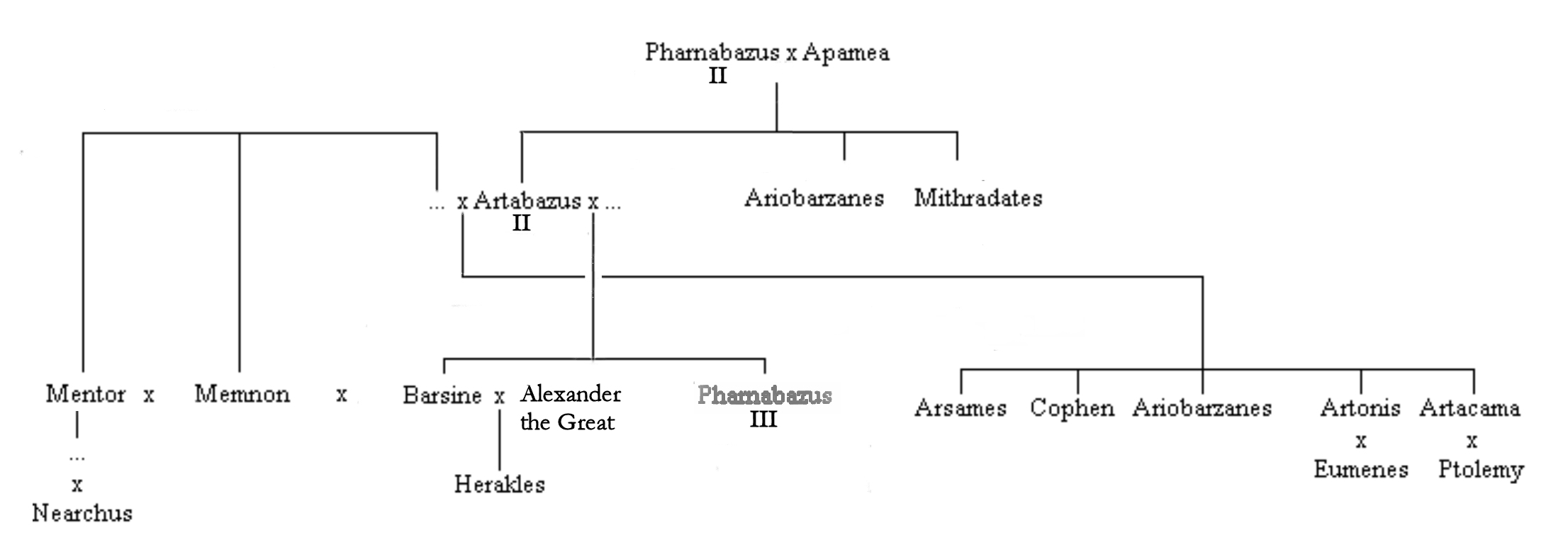
Family tree after Pharnabazus II.

== Sources ==
- Grimal, Nicolas (1992). A History of Ancient Egypt. Oxford: Blackwell Books. ISBN 978-0-631-19396-8.
- Lloyd, Alan B. (1994). "Egypt, 404–332 B.C.". The Fourth Century B.C. The Cambridge Ancient History. Vol. VI. ISBN 0-521-23348-8.
