= Pharnacid dynasty =

Persian dynasty ruling Hellespontine Phrygia

Pharnacid
- Parent house: Achaemenid dynasty
- Country: Hellespontine Phrygia (satrapy)
- Founder: Artabazos I of Phrygia
- Current head: Extinct
- Final ruler: Pharnabazus III
- Titles: Satrap of Hellespontine Phrygia; Ruler of Cius
- Estate: Dascylium
- Cadet branches: Mithridatic dynasty

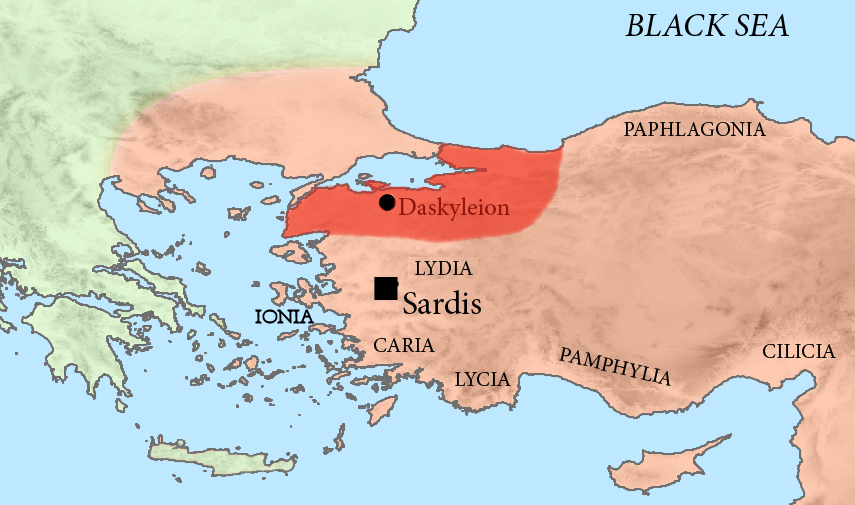
The Pharnacid dynasty ruled Hellespontine Phrygia during the whole time of Achaemenid rule in Asia Minor, until the conquests of Alexander the Great.

The Pharnacid dynasty was a Persian dynasty that ruled the satrapy of Hellespontine Phrygia under the Achaemenid Dynasty from the 5th until the 4th century BCE. It was founded by Artabazus, son of satrap Pharnaces I (younger brother of Hystaspes, who was born shortly before 565 BCE), son of Arsames (died ca. 520 BCE). They were directly related to the Achaemenid dynasty itself. The last member of the dynasty was Pharnabazus III.

Before the Pharnacids, Mitrobates (ca. 525–522 BCE) had ruled Hellespontine Phrygia for Cyrus the Great and Cambyses II, before being killed and his territory absorbed by the satrap of Lydia, Oroetes. Following the reorganization of Darius I, Mitrobates was succeeded by Oebares II (c.493), son of Megabazus, before Artabazus became satrap circa 479 BCE and started the Pharnacid dynasty, which would rule Hellespontine Phrygia until the conquests of Alexander the Great (338 BCE).

The residence of the Pharnacid Dynasty was at Dascylium (near modern-day Ergili, Turkey).

After the conquests of Alexander the Great, several women of the Pharnacid family, all daughters of Artabazos II, married Alexandrine nobility: Artonis married Eumenes, Artakama married Ptolemy I, while Barsine may have married Alexander the Great and given him a son, Heracles of Macedon.

== The Pharnacids ==
- Pharnaces I (Elamite: Parnaka; c. 550–497 BC)
- Artabazus I (fl. 480–455 BCE)
- Pharnabazus I (fl. 455–430 BCE)
- Pharnaces II of Phrygia (fl. 430–422 BCE)
- Pharnabazus II (fl. 422–387 BCE)
- Ariobarzanes of Phrygia (Persian: Ariyabrdhna; (fl. 407–362 BCE)
- Artabazus II (fl. 389–329 BCE)
- Pharnabazus III (fl. 370–320 BCE)

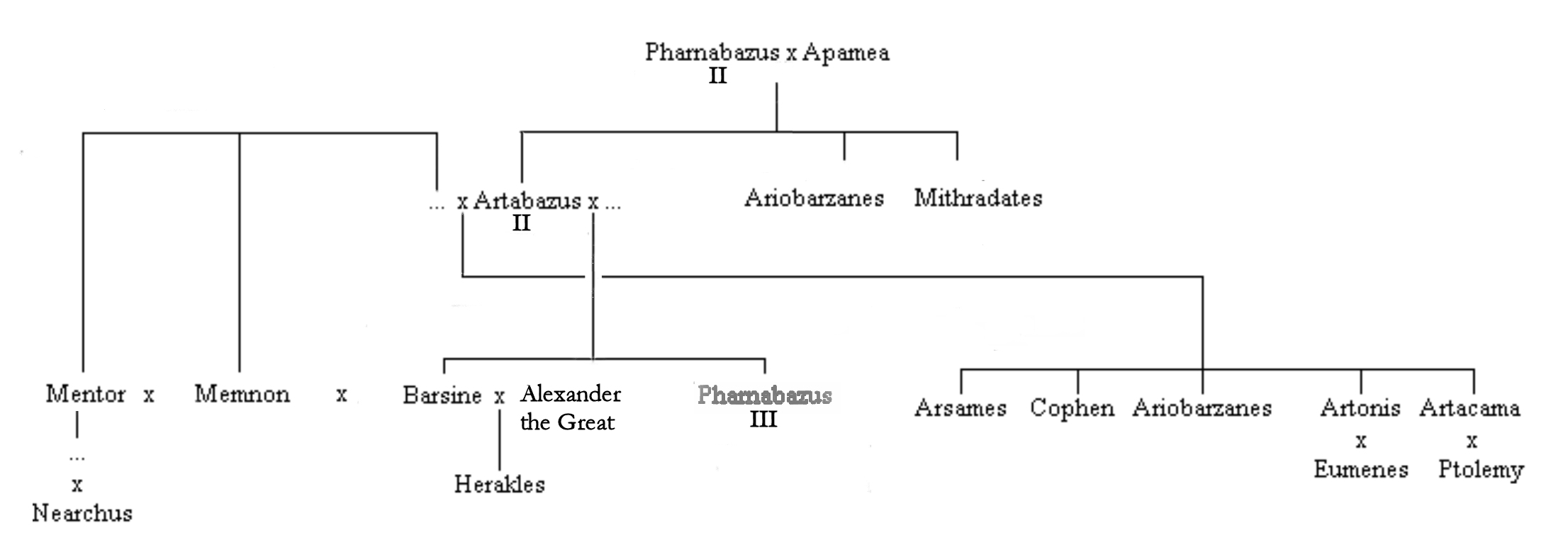
Family tree of the later Pharnacids.
