= Artabazos I of Phrygia =

5th-century BC Persian general and satrap

Artabazos (Ancient Greek: Ἀρτάβαζος; fl. 480 BC - 455 BC) was a Persian general in the army of Xerxes I, and later satrap of Hellespontine Phrygia (now northwest Turkey) under the Achaemenid dynasty, founder of the Pharnacid dynasty of satraps. He was the son of Pharnaces, who was the younger brother of Hystaspes, father of Darius I. Artabazos was therefore a first cousin of the great Achaemenid ruler Darius I.

== General in the Second Persian invasion of Greece ==
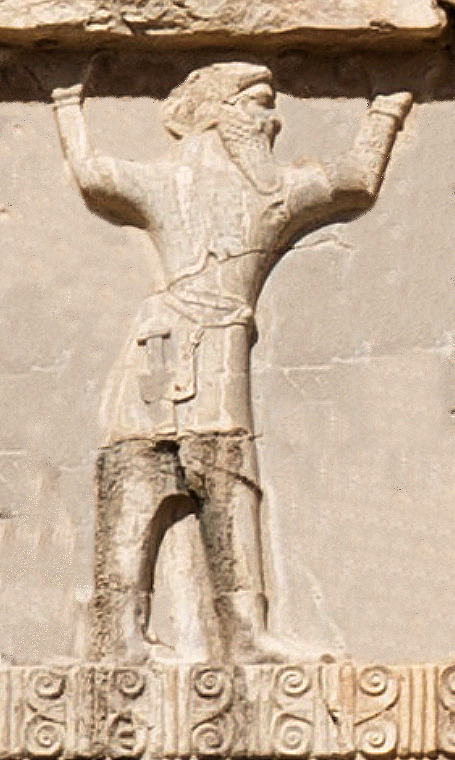
Parthian soldier

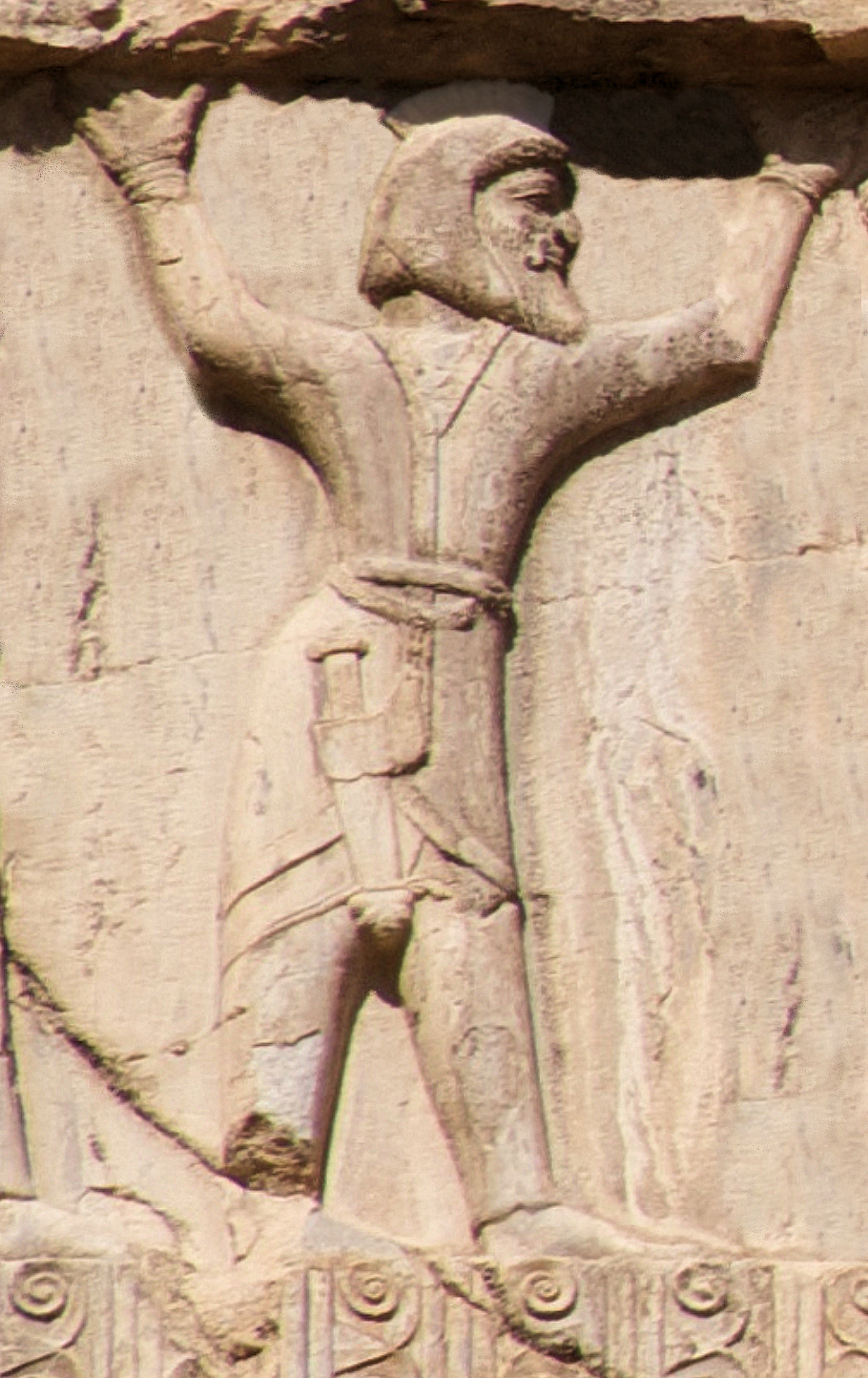
Chorasmian soldier

Artabazus was one of the generals of Xerxes in the 480 BC Second Persian invasion of Greece, in command of the Parthians and the Chorasmians in the Achaemenid army. He was particularly in charge of the reserve forces guarding the route back to Asia, and responsible for suppressing a revolt in Potidaea.

The invasion ended the following year with the commander-in-chief Mardonius, ignoring advice from Artabazus and others, meeting the Greeks in pitched battle at the Battle of Plataea and being defeated (479 BC). The Greeks followed up their victory by sailing to Ionia, where they destroyed the garrisoning forces under Tigranes at Mycale in the same year.

Artabazus, however, had refrained from engaging his troops at the Battle of Plataea, and thus managed to lead the remnant portion of a greatly reduced Achaemenid army out of Greece and back to Ionia. According to Herodotus and Plutarch, this force consisted of 40,000 men. Herodotus claims that in Thessaly he did not reveal the defeat as he would have been attacked, but claimed he needed to go to Thrace on a special mission. He was able to return to Persian territory despite losing men in attacks in Thrace.

== Satrap of Hellespontine Phrygia ==
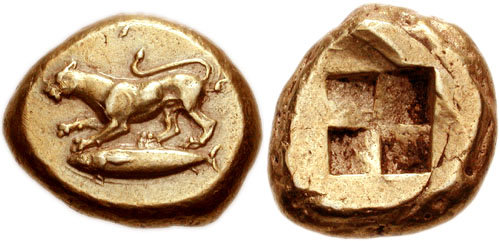
Coinage of Hellespontine Phrygia at the time of Artabazos I, Kyzikos, Mysia. Circa 500-450 BC. This type of electrum coins was treated as gold coinage, and competed alongside Achaemenid Darics.

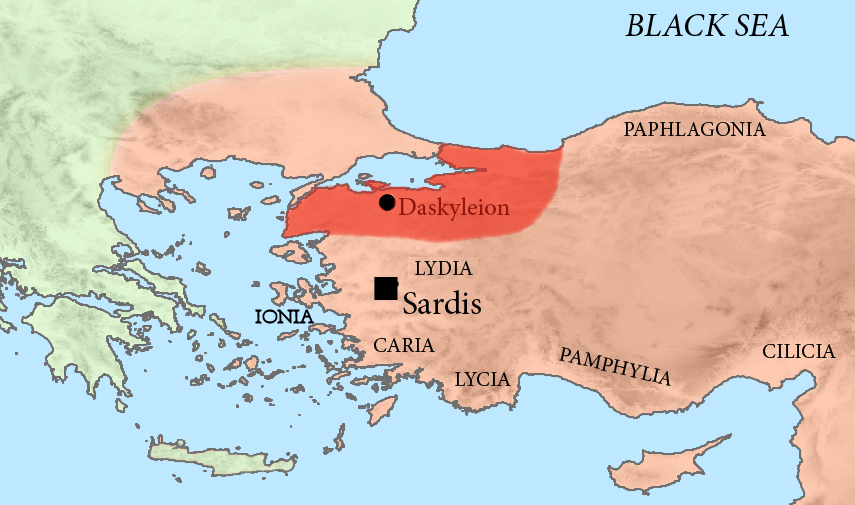
Artabazos I was Satrap of Hellespontine Phrygia.

As a reward, Artabazus was made satrap of Hellespontine Phrygia. He was already preceded in this role by several Achaemenid satraps: the first Achaemenid ruler of Hellespontine Phrygia had been Mitrobates (c. 525–522 BC), who was appointed by Cyrus the Great and continued under Cambyses II. He was killed and his territory absorbed by the satrap of neighbouring Lydia, Oroetes. Following the reorganization of Darius I, Mitrobates was succeeded by Oebares II (c.493), son of Megabazus.

Artabazus was named satrap of Hellespontine Phrygia in 479 BC. He was the first official satrap of the Pharnacid dynasty, named after his illustrious father Pharnaces. This office was passed down to his descendants, down to the conquests of Alexander the Great.

== Egypt and Cyprus campaigns ==
Artabazos, together with Megabyzus, then satrap of Syria, had command of the Persian armies sent to put down the revolt of Inarus in Egypt. They arrived in 456 BC, and within two years had put down the revolt, capturing Inarus and various Athenians supporting him. They then turned their attention to Cyprus, which was under attack by the Athenians, led by Cimon. Shortly afterwards hostilities between Persia and Athens ceased, called the peace of Callias.

=== Origin of the Egyptian campaign ===
When Xerxes I was assassinated in 465 BC, he was succeeded by his son Artaxerxes I, but several parts of the Achaemenid empire soon revolted, foremost of which were Bactria and Egypt. The Egyptian Inarus defeated the Persian satrap of Egypt Achaemenes, a brother of Artaxerxes, and took control of Lower Egypt. He contacted the Greeks, who were also officially still at war with Persia, and in 460 BC, Athens sent an expeditionary force of 200 ships and 6,000 heavy infantry to support Inarus. The Egyptian and Athenian troops defeated the local Persian troops of Egypt, and captured the city of Memphis, except for the Persian citadel which they besieged for several years.

=== Siege of Memphis (459-455 BC) ===
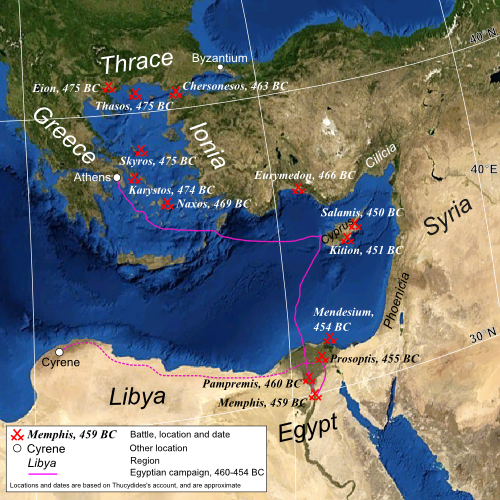
Megabyzus fought against the Athenians and the Egyptians in the Siege of Memphis (459-455 BC) and the Siege of Prosopitis (455 BC).

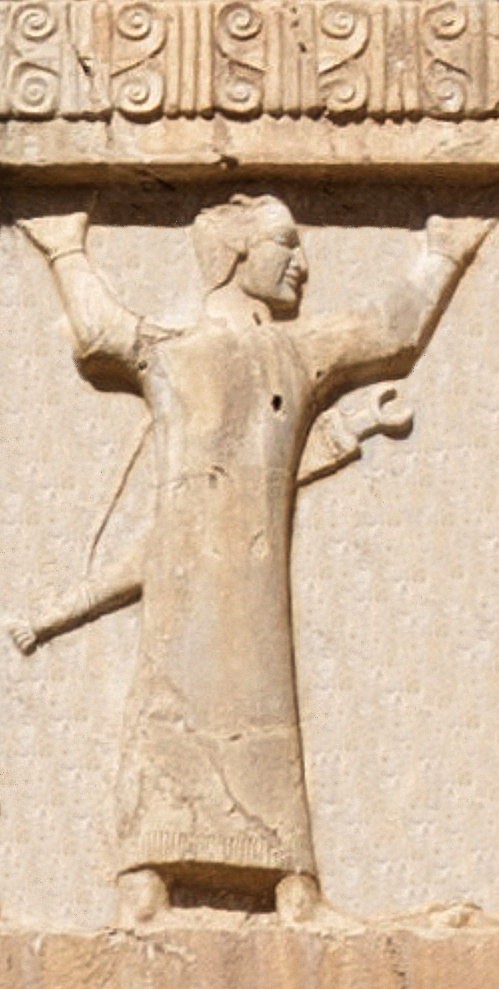
Egyptian soldier, circa 470 BC. Xerxes I tomb relief.

The Athenians and Egyptians had settled down to besiege the local Persian troops in Egypt, at the White Castle. The siege evidently did not progress well, and probably lasted for at least four years, since Thucydides says that their whole expedition lasted 6 years, and of this time the final 18 months was occupied with the Siege of Prosoptis.

According to Thucydides, at first Artaxerxes sent Megabazus to try and bribe the Spartans into invading Attica, to draw off the Athenian forces from Egypt. When this failed, he instead assembled a large army under Megabyzus, and dispatched it to Egypt. Diodorus has more or less the same story, with more detail; after the attempt at bribery failed, Artaxerxes put Megabyzus and Artabazus in charge of 300,000 men, with instructions to quell the revolt. They went first from Persia to Cilicia and gathered a fleet of 300 triremes from the Cilicians, Phoenicians and Cypriots, and spent a year training their men. Then they finally headed to Egypt. Modern estimates, however, place the number of Persian troops at the considerably lower figure of 25,000 men given that it would have been highly impractical to deprive the already strained satrapies of any more man power than that. Thucydides does not mention Artabazus, who is reported by Herodotus to have taken part in the second Persian invasion; Diodorus may be mistaken about his presence in this campaign. It is clearly possible that the Persian forces did spend some prolonged time in training, since it took four years for them to respond to the Egyptian victory at Papremis. Although neither author gives many details, it is clear that when Megabyzus finally arrived in Egypt, he was able to quickly lift the Siege of Memphis, defeating the Egyptians in battle, and driving the Athenians from Memphis.

=== Siege of Prosopitis (455 BC) ===
The Athenians now fell back to the island of Prosopitis in the Nile delta, where their ships were moored. There, Megabyzus laid siege to them for 18 months, until finally he was able to drain the river from around the island by digging canals, thus "joining the island to the mainland". In Thucydides's account the Persians then crossed over to the former island, and captured it. Only a few of the Athenian force, marching through Libya to Cyrene survived to return to Athens. In Diodorus's version, however, the draining of the river prompted the Egyptians (whom Thucydides does not mention) to defect and surrender to the Persians. The Persians, not wanting to sustain heavy casualties in attacking the Athenians, instead allowed them to depart freely to Cyrene, whence they returned to Athens. Since the defeat of the Egyptian expedition caused a genuine panic in Athens, including the relocation of the Delian treasury to Athens, Thucydides's version is probably more likely to be correct.

== Succession ==
He was succeeded by his son, Pharnabazus I (fl. 455 BC - 430 BC), of whom little is known, and then by his grandson Pharnaces II of Phrygia (fl. 430 BC - 413 BC), who is known to have been satrap at the outset of the Peloponnesian War. Pharnaces was in turn succeeded by his son, Pharnabazus II (fl. 413 BC - 373 BC), who is well known for his rivalry with Tissaphernes and wars against the Spartans.

== See also ==
- Pharnacid Dynasty
