= Mitrobates =

6th-century BCE Achaemenid satrap of Daskyleion

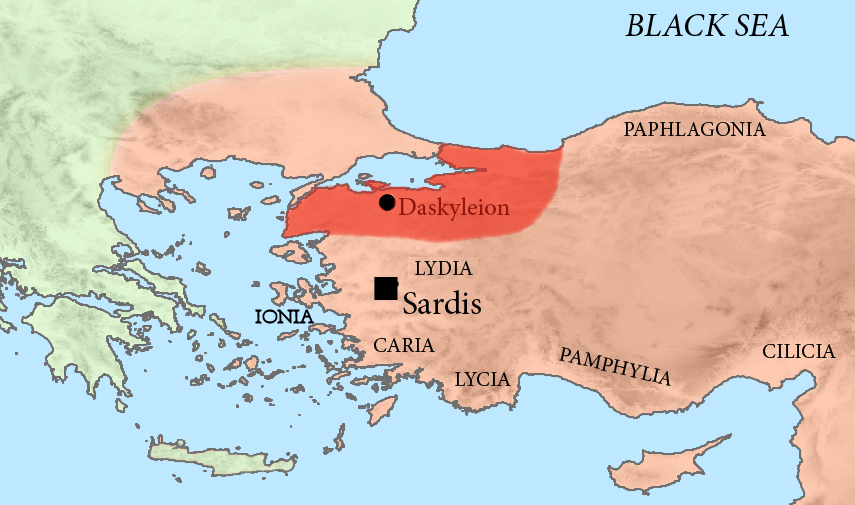
Location of Hellespontine Phrygia, and the provincial capital of Dascylium, in the Achaemenid Empire, c. 500 BCE

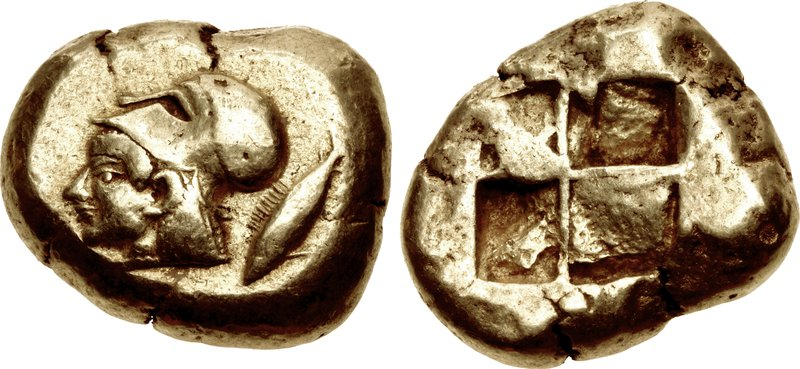
Coinage of Hellespontine Phrygia at the time of Mitrobates, Kyzikos, Mysia. Circa 550-500 BC

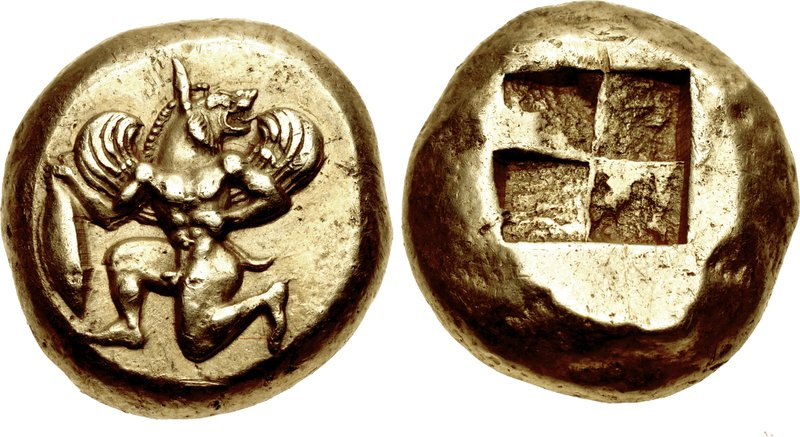
Coinage of Hellespontine Phrygia at the time of Mitrobates, Kyzikos, Mysia. Circa 550-500 BCE

Mitrobates (Old Persian: *Miθrapātah; Ancient Greek: Μιτροβάτης, romanized: Mitrobátēs); (fl.c. 525 - 520 BC) was an Achaemenid satrap of Daskyleion (Hellespontine Phrygia) under the reigns of Cyrus the Great, who nominated him for the role, and Cambyses. After Cambyses died, and during the struggles for succession that followed, he is said to have been assassinated, together with his son Cranaspes, by the neighbouring satrap of Lydia, Oroetes, who wanted to expand his Anatolian territories. After the assassination, Oroetes added the territory of Hellespontine Phrygia to his own.

After Cambyses had died and the Magians won the kingship, Oroetes stayed in Sardis, where he in no way helped the Persians to regain the power taken from them by the Medes, but contrariwise; for in this confusion he slew two notable Persians, Mitrobates, the governor from Dascyleium, who had taunted him concerning Polycrates, and Mitrobates' son Cranaspes; and besides many other violent deeds, when a messenger from Darius came with a message which displeased him, he set an ambush by the way and killed that messenger on his journey homewards, and made away with the man's body and horse. So when Darius became king he was minded to punish Oroetes for all his wrongdoing, and chiefly for the killing of Mitrobates and his son.

— Herodotus III, 126-127.

These events took place in the troubled times of the interregnum between Cambyses and Darius I, with the usurpation of Gaumata, who Herodotus refers to as "the Magians". The story of early satraps of Asia Minor, including Mitrobates, was related by Herodotus.

Mitrobates is the first known Persian satrap of Daskyleion (c. 525–520 BCE). Following the reorganisation of satraps by Darius I, he was succeeded by Megabazus (circa 500 BCE) and then his son Oebares II (c. 493 BCE) and Artabazus (479 BCE), who established the Persian Pharnacid dynasty, which would rule Hellespontine Phrygia until the conquests of Alexander the Great (338 BCE).
