= Oebares II =

Satrap of Daskyleion (Hellespontine Phrygia) in 493 BC

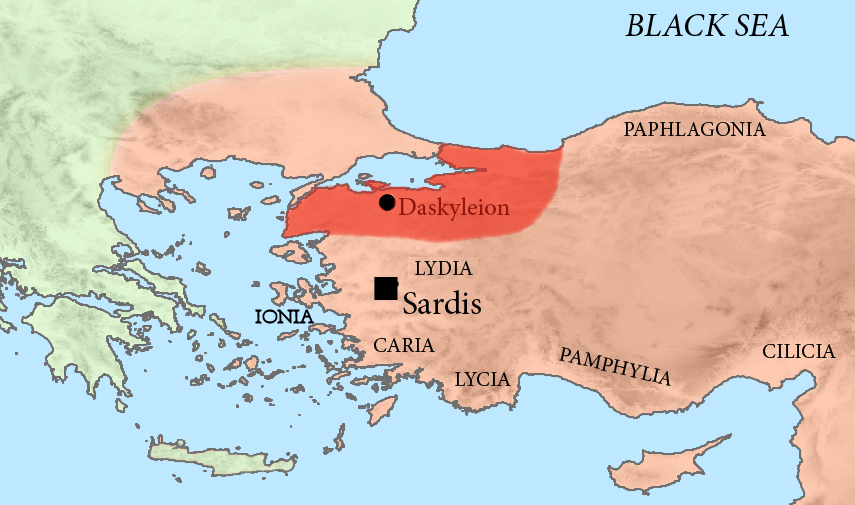
Oebares became satrap of Hellespontine Phrygia.

Oebares II (Old Persian: Vaubara) was, according to Herodotus (Herodotus 6.33) a son of Megabazus, himself a first degree cousin of Darius I. Oebares became satrap of Daskyleion (Hellespontine Phrygia) in 493 BC, after his father.

Herodotus mentions Oebares, when writing about the retaliatory actions of the Achaemenid fleet following the Ionian revolt:

"The Phoenicians, having burnt these places aforesaid, turned against Proconnesus and Artace, and having given these also to the flames sailed back to the Chersonese to make an end of the remnant of the towns, as many as they had not destroyed at their former landing. But against Cyzicus they did not so much as sail at all; for the Cyzicenes had before this visitation of the fleet already made themselves the king's subjects, by an agreement which they made with the viceroy at Dascyleum, Oebares son of Megabazus."

— Herodotus, VI-33

One of Oebares' brothers was named Megabates. He was a commander of the Achaemenid fleet that sailed against Naxos in 500/499 BC. He also was Satrap of Daskyleion in the early 470s.

In 479 BC, Artabazos was named the new satrap of Hellespontine Phrygia. He was the first official satrap of the Pharnacid dynasty, named after his illustrious father Pharnaces. This office was passed down to his descendants, down to the conquests of Alexander the Great.
