= Calas (general) =

4th-century BC Macedonian general

Satrap Calas
- Κάλας
- Born: 4th century BC
- Disappeared: before 325 BC
- Relatives: Harpalus (father)
- Military career
- Allegiance: Macedonia
- Rank: General
- Conflicts: Wars of Alexander the Great; Battle of the Granicus

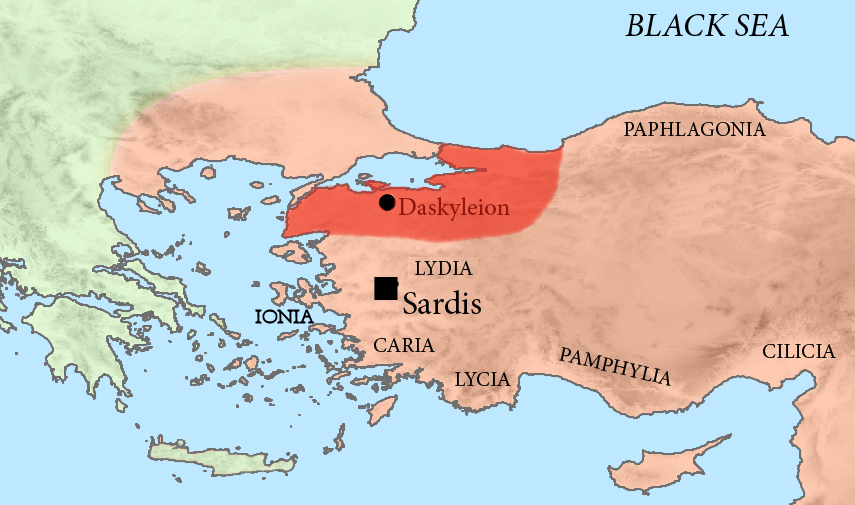
Location of Hellespontine Phrygia, and the provincial capital of Dascylium, in the Achaemenid Empire, c. 500 BC.

Calas or Callas (Greek: Κάλας or Κάλλας; lived 4th century BC) was an ancient Greek, son of Harpalus of Elimiotis and first cousin to Antigonus, king of Asia.

== Asian campaign of Philip II ==
Calas held a command in the army which Philip II sent into Anatolia under Parmenion and Attalus, 336 BC, to further his cause among the Greek cities there. In 335 BC Calas was defeated in a battle in the Troad by Memnon of Rhodes, but took refuge in Rhaeteum.

== Campaigns of Alexander the Great ==
At the Battle of the Granicus in 334 BC he led the Thessalian cavalry in Alexander's army, and was appointed by him in the same year to the satrapy of the Lesser or Hellespontine Phrygia, to which Paphlagonia was soon after added. Excluding a failed attempt to conquer Bithynia, we do not hear of Calas: it would seem, however, that he died before the treason and flight of his father in 325, as we know from Arrian that Demarchus succeeded him in the satrapy of the Hellespontine Phrygia during Alexander's life-time.
