= Pharnaces (son of Arsames) =

Persian satrap of Hellespontine Phrygia (c. 565-497 BCE)

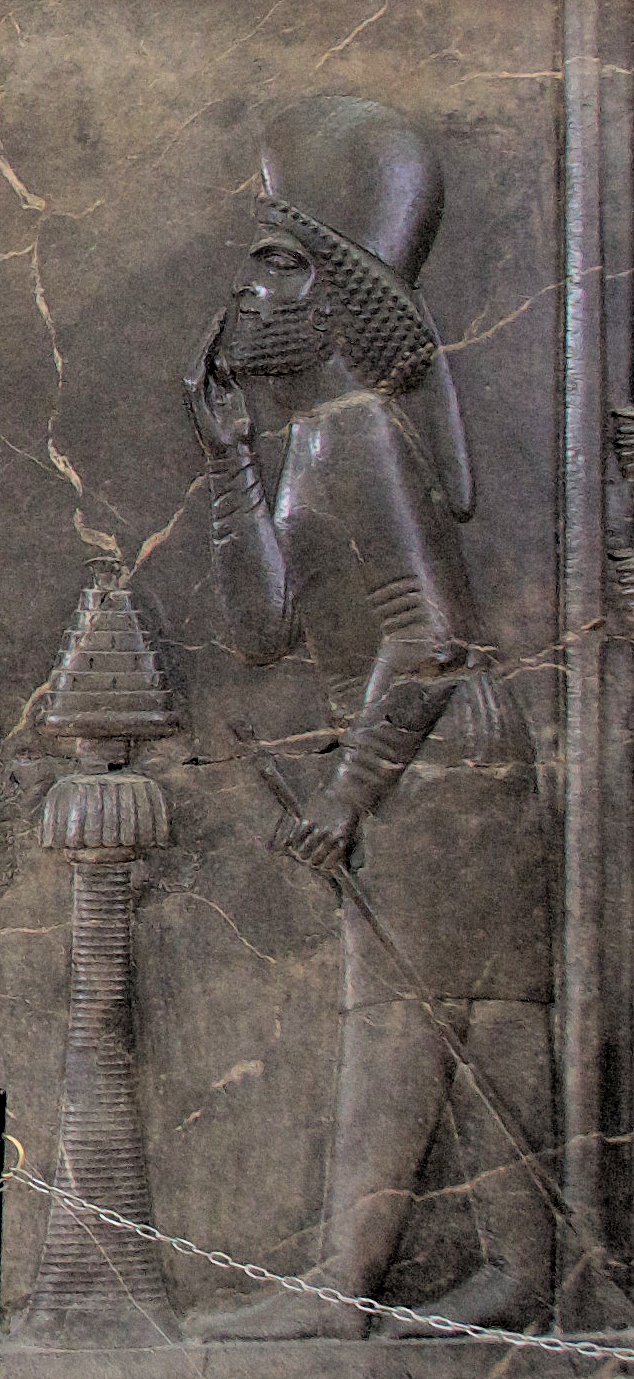
Likely image of Pharnaces as Mayor of the Palace, appearing in front of Darius and performing Proskynesis, in the Central relief of the Apadana, Persepolis.

Pharnaces Ι (Greek: Φαρνάκης; Elamite: Parnaka; c. 565–497 BCE) was a son of Arsames. He was a younger brother of Hystaspes, and therefore an uncle of Achaemenid Emperor Darius I, son of Hystaspes. He was the founder of the Pharnacid dynasty that ruled over Hellespontine Phrygia.

== Mayor of the Palace ==
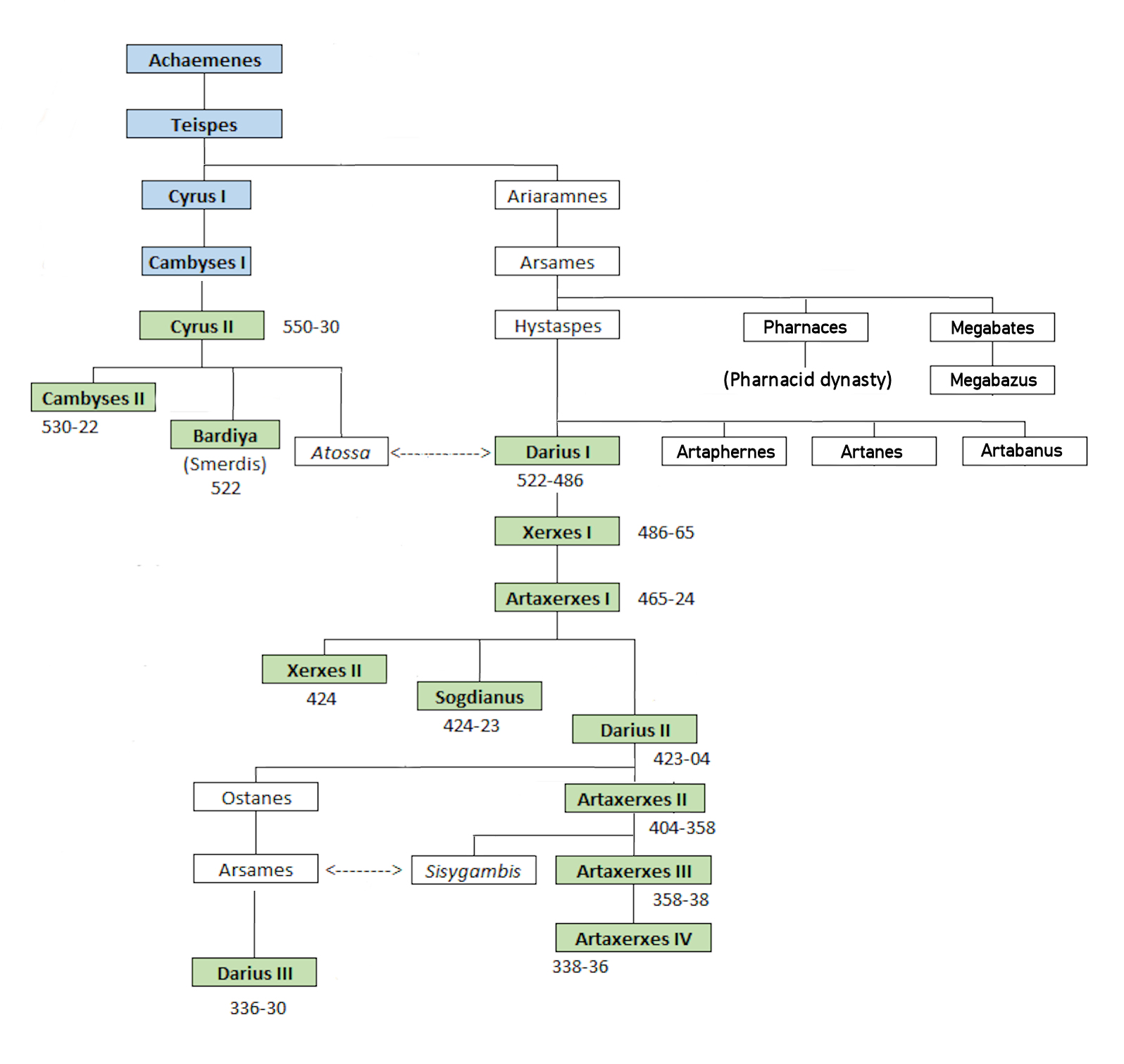
Pharnaces was son of Arsames, and brother of Hystaspes.

According to the fortification tablets found at Persepolis, Pharnaces was the chief economic official to Darius I between 506 and 497 BCE. He was a Mayor of the Palace, his statutory attribute being a short stick, probably made of a precious metal. He likely appears on some of the reliefs in Persepolis.

== Hellespontine Phrygia ==
Pharnaces became involved at some point with Hellespontine Phrygia in Asia Minor (modern northwest Turkey), since Aristotle of Stagira mentions that Pharnaces introduced mules in the region.

Pharnaces had a son named Artabazus, who was appointed as satrap of Hellespontine Phrygia by Xerxes I circa 477 BCE. Artabazus and his heirs, known as the "Pharnacid dynasty" after Pharnaces, would rule the region into the 4th century BCE and until its take-over by Alexander the Great.
