= Pharnaces II of Phrygia =

5th-century BCE ruler of the satrapy of Hellespontine Phrygia

Pharnaces II (Old Iranian: Farnaka; fl. 430 BCE - 422 BCE) ruled the satrapy of Hellespontine Phrygia under the Achaemenid Dynasty of Persia. Hellespontine Phrygia (Greek: Ἑλλησποντιακὴ Φρυγία) comprised the lands of Troad, Mysia and Bithynia and had its seat at Daskyleion, south of Cyzicus, Mysia (near modern-day Erdek, Balıkesir Province, Turkey).

His grandfather, Artabazos I of Phrygia, was the founder of the Pharnacid dynasty. Pharnaces II followed as satrap either upon the death of his father, Pharnabazus I, or directly upon the death of his grandfather. He was succeeded by his son Pharnabazus II.

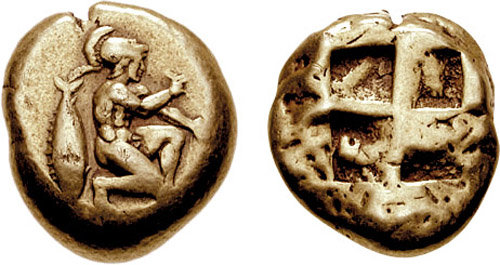
Coinage of Hellespontine Phrygia at the time of Pharnaces II, Kyzikos, Mysia, circa 460-400 BC

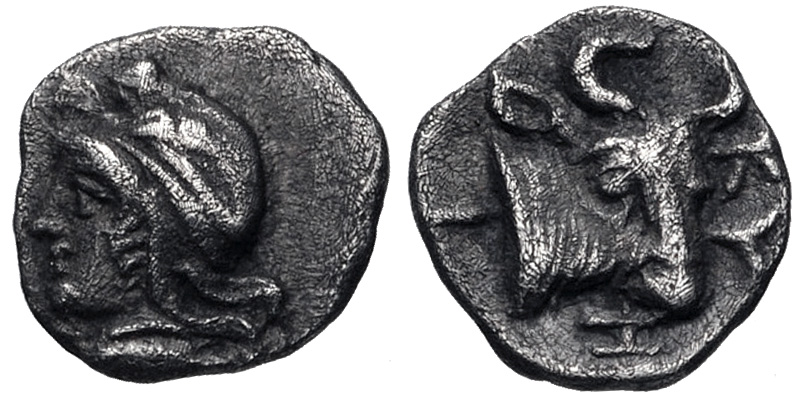
Coinage of Hellespontine Phrygia at the time of Pharnaces II, Kyzikos, Mysia, circa 450-400 BC

== See also ==
- Pharnacid Dynasty
