= Pharnabazus I =

5th-century BCE satrap of Hellespontine Phrygia

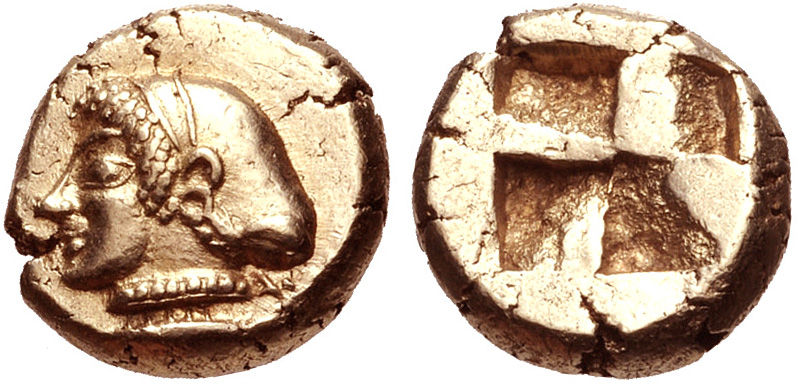
Coinage of Hellespontine Phrygia at the time of Pharnabazus I, Kyzikos, Mysia. Circa 500–450 BC. This type of electrum coins were treated as gold coinage, and competed alongside Achaemenid Darics.

Pharnabazus (Old Iranian: Farnabāzu, Ancient Greek: Φαρνάβαζος; died before 430 BCE), was a member of the Pharnacid dynasty that governed the province of Hellespontine Phrygia as satraps for the Achaemenid Empire.

He is a very obscure figure, almost always mentioned alongside his father Artabazus. He may have succeeded his father as satrap between 455 and 430 BCE, but it is also possible that Artabazus was directly succeeded by his grandson (Pharnabazus' son), Pharnaces II.
