= Ergili, Bandırma =

Village in Turkey

Ergili
- Neighbourhood
- Location in Turkey Ergili (Marmara)
- Coordinates: 40°07′46″N 28°04′12″E
- Country: Turkey
- Province: Balıkesir
- District: Bandırma
- Population (2022): 310
- Time zone: UTC+3 (TRT)

Ergili is a neighbourhood in the municipality and district of Bandırma, located in Balıkesir Province, Turkey. As of 2022, the population is 310.

== History ==
Under the Persian Empire the site of ancient Dascylium.
