= Hellespontine Phrygia =

Satrapy of the Achaemenid Empire (525-321 BC)

- Satrapy of the Persian Empire
- 525 BC–321 BC
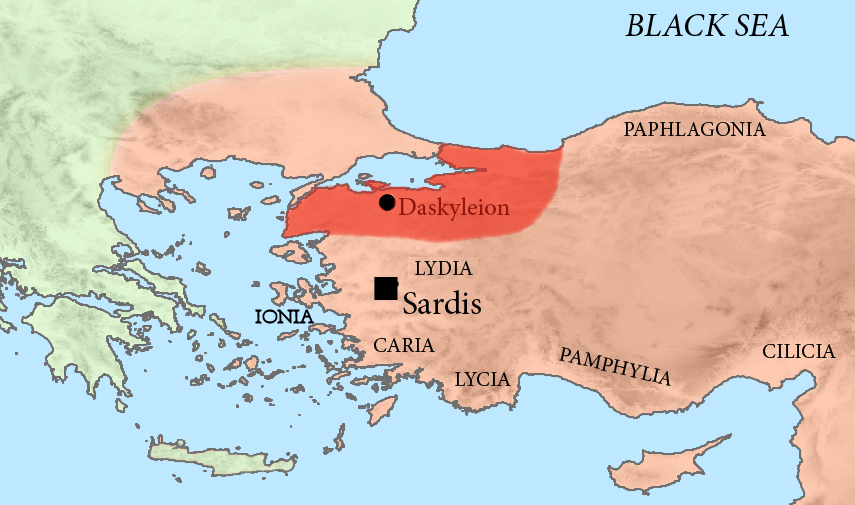
- The location of Hellespontine Phrygia, and the provincial capital of Dascylium, in the Achaemenid Empire, c. 500 BC.
- Capital: Dascylium (modern-day Ergili, Bandırma, Balıkesir, Turkey)
- History
  - Established: 525 BC
  - Disestablished: 321 BC
Succeeded by
Macedonian Empire

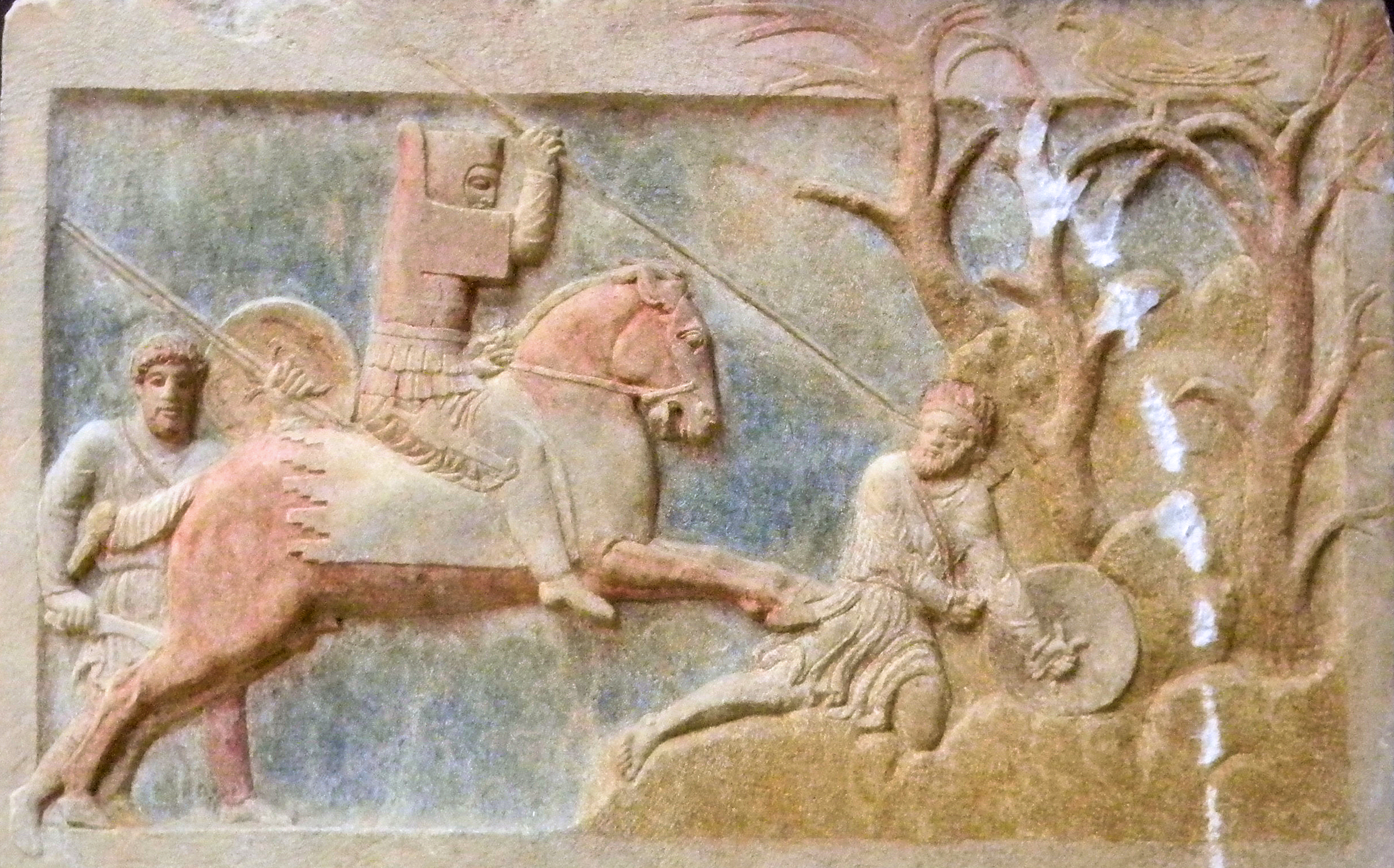
An Achaemenid dynast of Hellespontine Phrygia attacking a Greek psilos, Altıkulaç Sarcophagus, early 4th century BC.

Hellespontine Phrygia (Ancient Greek: Ἑλλησποντιακὴ Φρυγία, romanized: Hellēspontiakē Phrygia) or Lesser Phrygia (Ancient Greek: μικρᾶ Φρυγία, romanized: mikra Phrygia) was a Persian satrapy (province) in northwestern Anatolia, directly southeast of the Hellespont. Its capital was Dascylium, and for most of its existence it was ruled by the hereditary Persian Pharnacid dynasty. Together with Greater Phrygia, it made up the administrative provinces of the wider Phrygia region.

== History ==
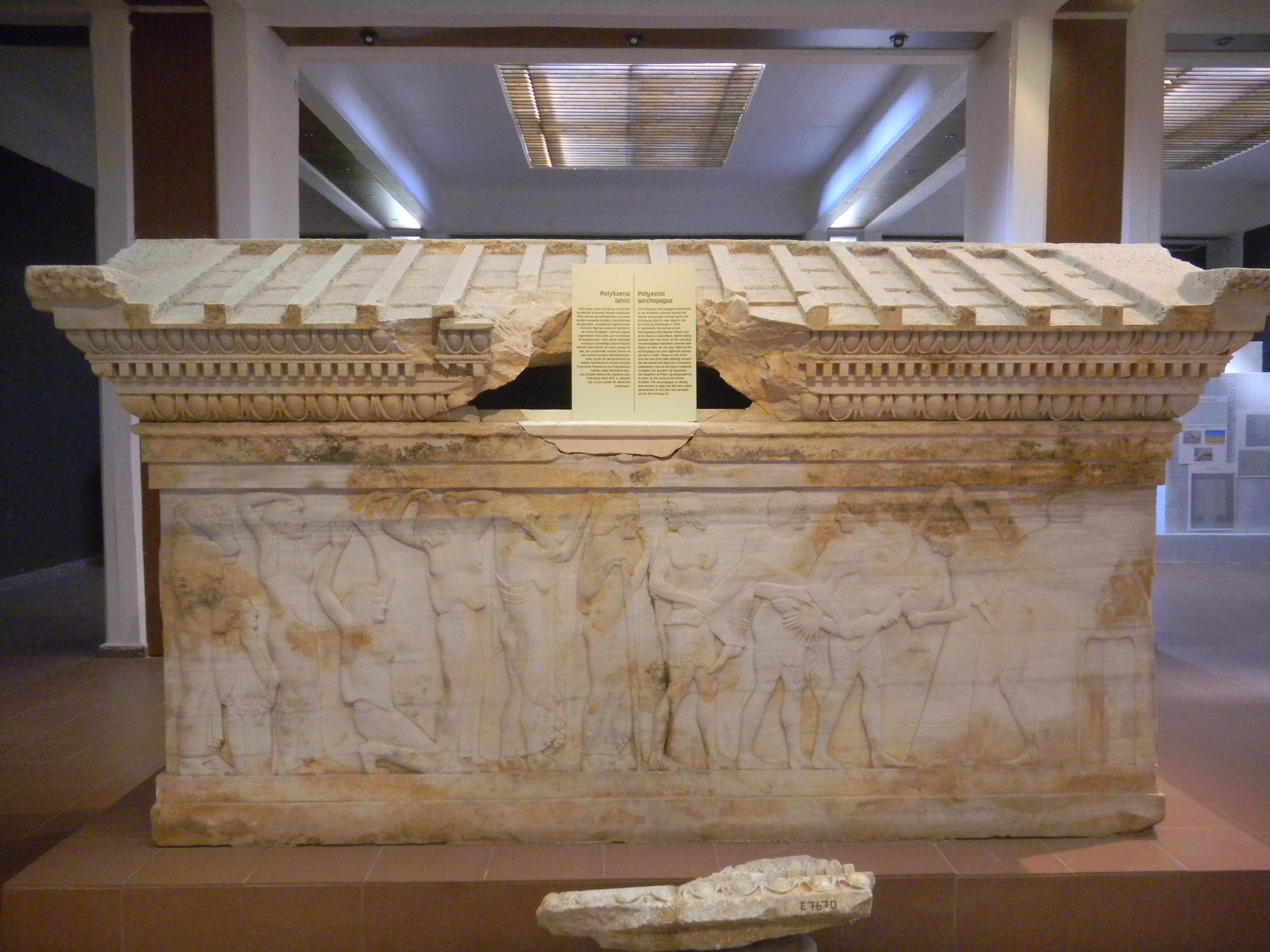
The Polyxena sarcophagus from Hellespontine Phrygia, in Late Greek Archaic style, 520-500 BC. Çanakkale Archaeological Museum.

The satrapy was created in the beginning of the fifth century BC, during the time of administrative reorganisations of the territories in western Asia Minor, which were amongst the most important Achaemenid territories.

The first Achaemenid ruler of Hellespontine Phrygia was Mitrobates (ca. 525–522 BC), who was appointed by Cyrus the Great and continued under Cambyses. He was killed and his territory absorbed by the satrap of neighbouring Lydia, Oroetes. Following the reorganization of Darius I, Mitrobates was succeeded by Oebares II (c.493), son of Megabazus.

Artabazus then became satrap circa 479 BC and started the Pharnacid dynasty, which would rule Hellespontine Phrygia until the conquests of Alexander the Great (338 BC).

As Alexander the Great was conquering and incorporating the Achaemenid Empire, he appointed Calas, a Macedonian General to govern Hellespontine Phrygia in 334 BC, after he had sent Parmenion to secure Dascylium, the provincial capital. Calas, being the very first non-Achaemenid ruler of the province, was awarded the Persian title of "satrap", rather than a Macedonian title, and Alexander instructed him to collect the same tribute from his subjects that had been paid to Darius III. After Alexander's death in 323, the satrapy was awarded to Leonnatus, who was killed in action in the Lamian War. The region was seized by Lysimachus, was added to the Seleucid Empire after the Battle of Corupedium (281 BC), and was finally integrated in the Bithynian kingdom.

== Persian satraps of Hellespontine Phrygia ==
=== Achaemenid satraps ===
- Mitrobates (circa 520 BC)
- Megabazus (circa 500 BC)
- Oebares II (circa 493 BC)
- Artabazos I of Phrygia - r. 477–455 (?)
- Pharnabazus I - r. 455 (?) - before 430
- Pharnaces II - r. before 430 - after 422
- Pharnabazus II - r. before 413 - 387
- Ariobarzanes of Phrygia - r. 387-363/362
- Artabazos II - r. 363/362-353
- Arsites - r. 353-334

=== Macedonian satraps ===
- Calas - r. 334-323
- Leonnatus - r. 323-321
- possibly Antipater - r. before 277
- Meleager - r. around 275 - 269

== Sources ==
- Kinzl, Konrad H. (2008). A Companion to the Classical Greek World. John Wiley & Sons. ISBN 978-1405172011.
- Lyons, Justin D. (2015). Alexander the Great and Hernán Cortés: Ambiguous Legacies of Leadership. Lexington Books. ISBN 978-1498505284.
- Scott, James M. (1995). Paul and the Nations: The Old Testament and Jewish Background of Paul's Mission to the Nations with Special Reference to the Destination of Galatians. Mohr Siebeck. ISBN 978-3161463778.
