= Oroetus =

6th century BC Persian Satrap of Lydia

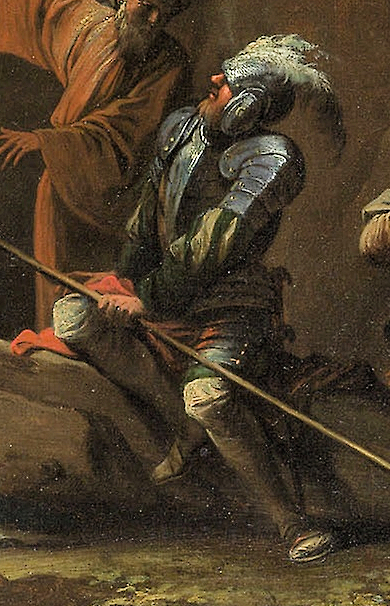
Oroetus attending the crucifixion of Polycrates (17th century painting, by Salvator Rosa).

Oroetus, or Oroetes (Old Iranian: Arvita, Ancient Greek: Ὀροίτης), was a Persian Satrap of Lydia (c. 530–520 BC), during the reigns of Cyrus the Great, Cambyses and Darius the Great, succeeding Harpagus, and being followed by Bagaeus. He is described by Herodotus in the third book of his Histories, where he achieved notoriety for the death of Polycrates, tyrant of Samos:

What I will now relate happened about the time of Cambyses's sickness. The viceroy of Sardis appointed by Cyrus was Oroetes, a Persian. This man purposed to do a great wrong; for though he had received no hurt by word or deed from Polycrates of Samos, nor had even seen him, he formed the desire of seizing and killing him. The reason alleged by most was this:—As Oroetes and another Persian, Mitrobates by name, governor of the province of Dascyleium, sat by the king's door, they fell from talk to wrangling and comparing of their several achievements: and Mitrobates taunted Oroetes, saying, "You are not to be accounted a man; the island of Samos lies close to your province, yet you have not added it to the king's dominion—an island so easy to conquer that some native of it rose against his rulers with fifteen men at arms, and is now lord of it. Some say that Oroetes, angered by this taunt, was less desirous of punishing the utterer of it than of by all means destroying the reason of the reproach, namely Polycrates.

— Herodotus III, 120.

Oroetus became the first satrap recorded as demonstrating insubordination towards the central power of Persia. When Cambyses (r. 530–522 BC), who succeeded his father Cyrus, died, the Persian Empire was in chaos prior to Darius the Great (522–486 BC) finally securing control. Oroetus defied Darius's orders to assist him, whereupon the Achaemenid nobleman Bagaeus was sent by Darius to arrange his murder.

After Cambyses had died and the Magians won the kingship, Oroetes stayed in Sardis, where he in no way helped the Persians to regain the power taken from them by the Medes, but contrariwise; for in this confusion he slew two notable Persians, Mitrobates, the governor from Dascyleium, who had taunted him concerning Polycrates, and Mitrobates's son Cranaspes; and besides many other violent deeds, when a messenger from Darius came with a message which displeased him, he set an ambush by the way and killed that messenger on his journey homewards, and made away with the man's body and horse. So when Darius became king he was minded to punish Oroetes for all his wrongdoing, and chiefly for the killing of Mitrobates and his son.

— Herodotus III, 126–127.

== Oroetus in Art ==
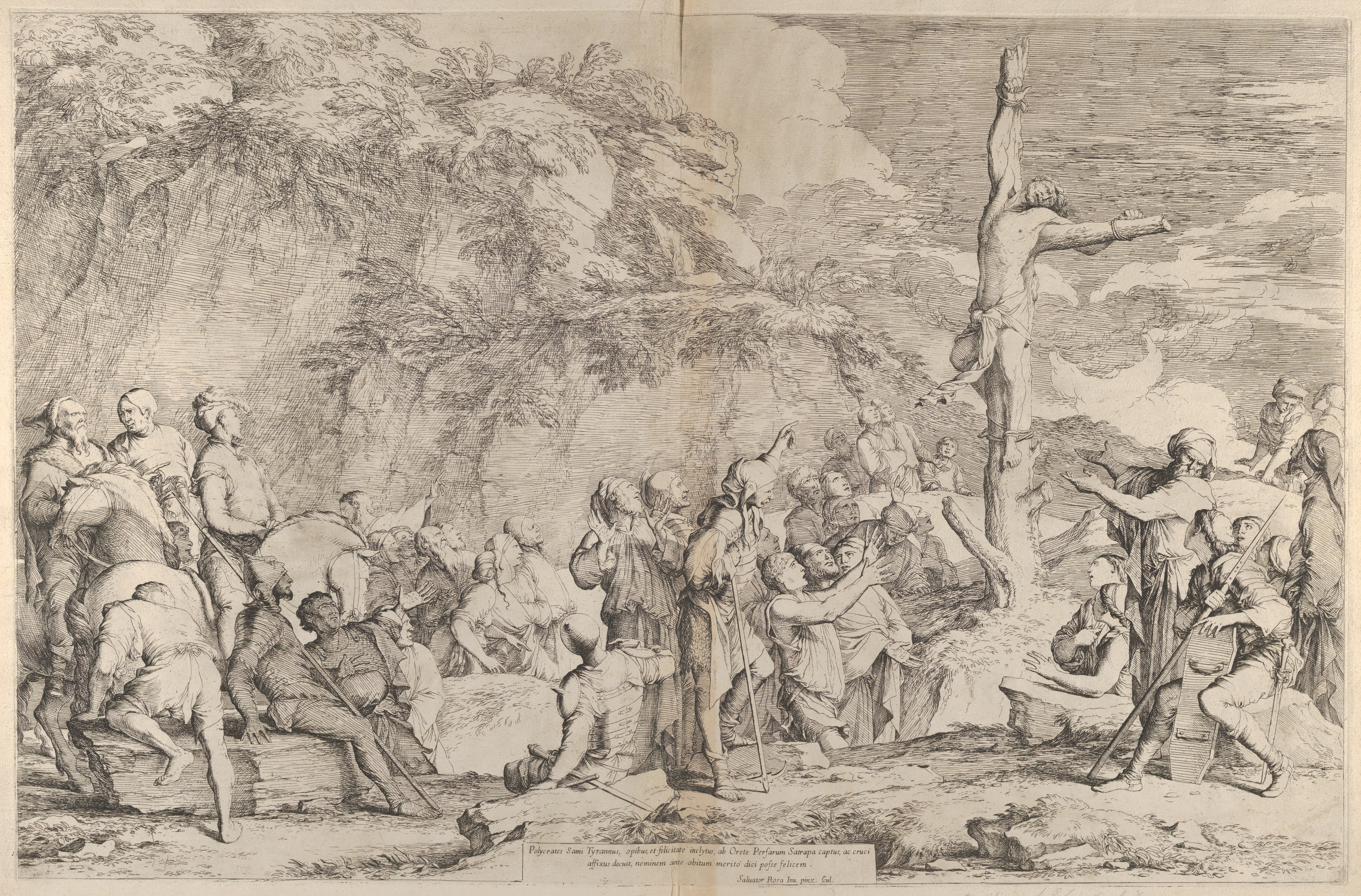
The crucifixion of Polycrates the tyrant after his capture by the Persian Oroetus (17th century).

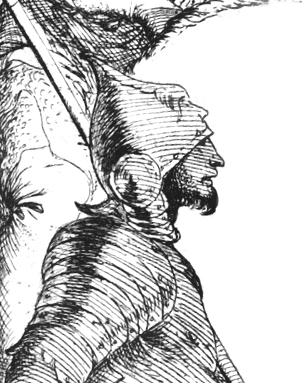
Oroetus (detail).

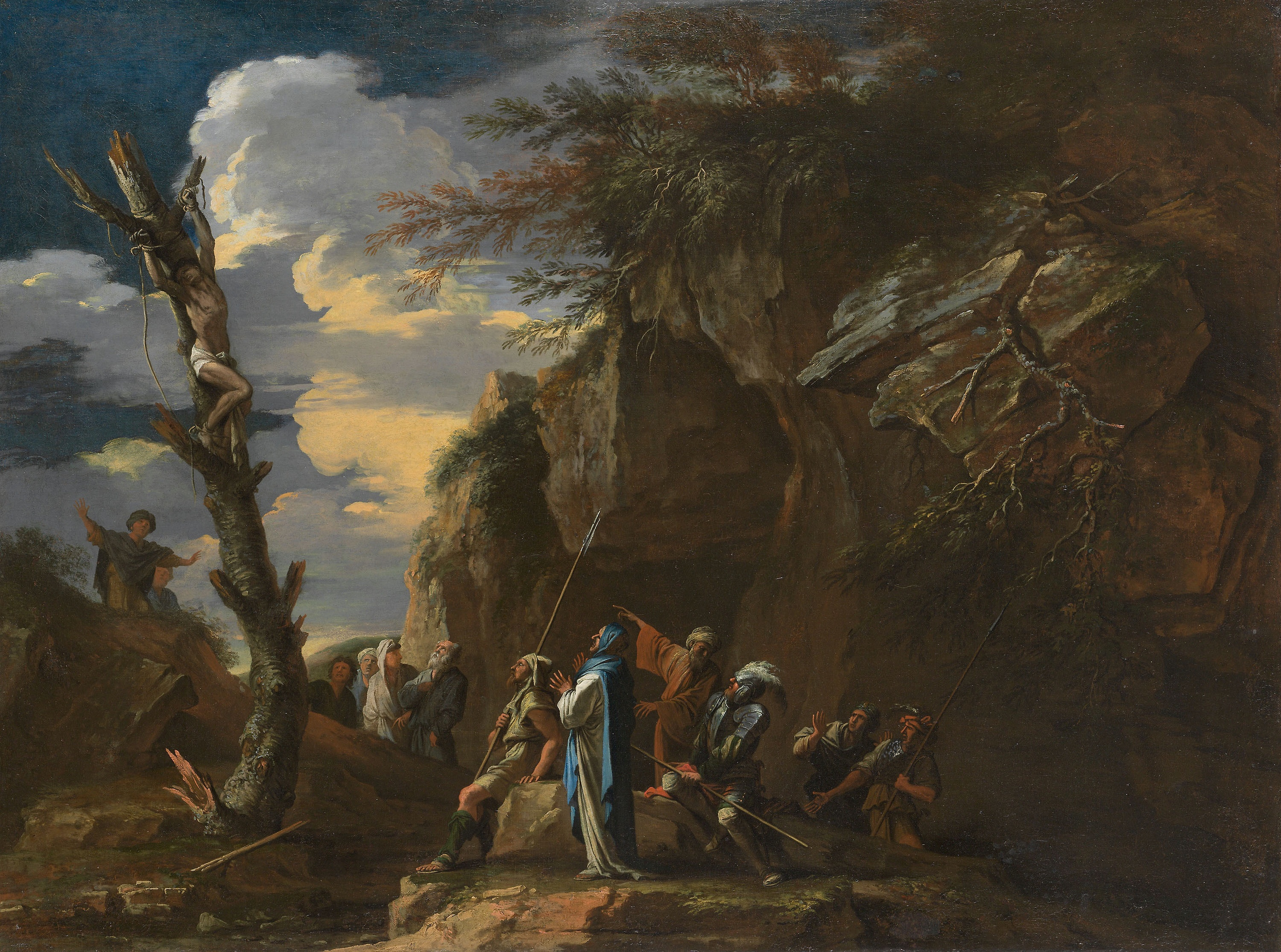
The crucifixion of Polycrates by Oroetus
