= Megabazus =

6th century BC Persian general

- Bakabadus
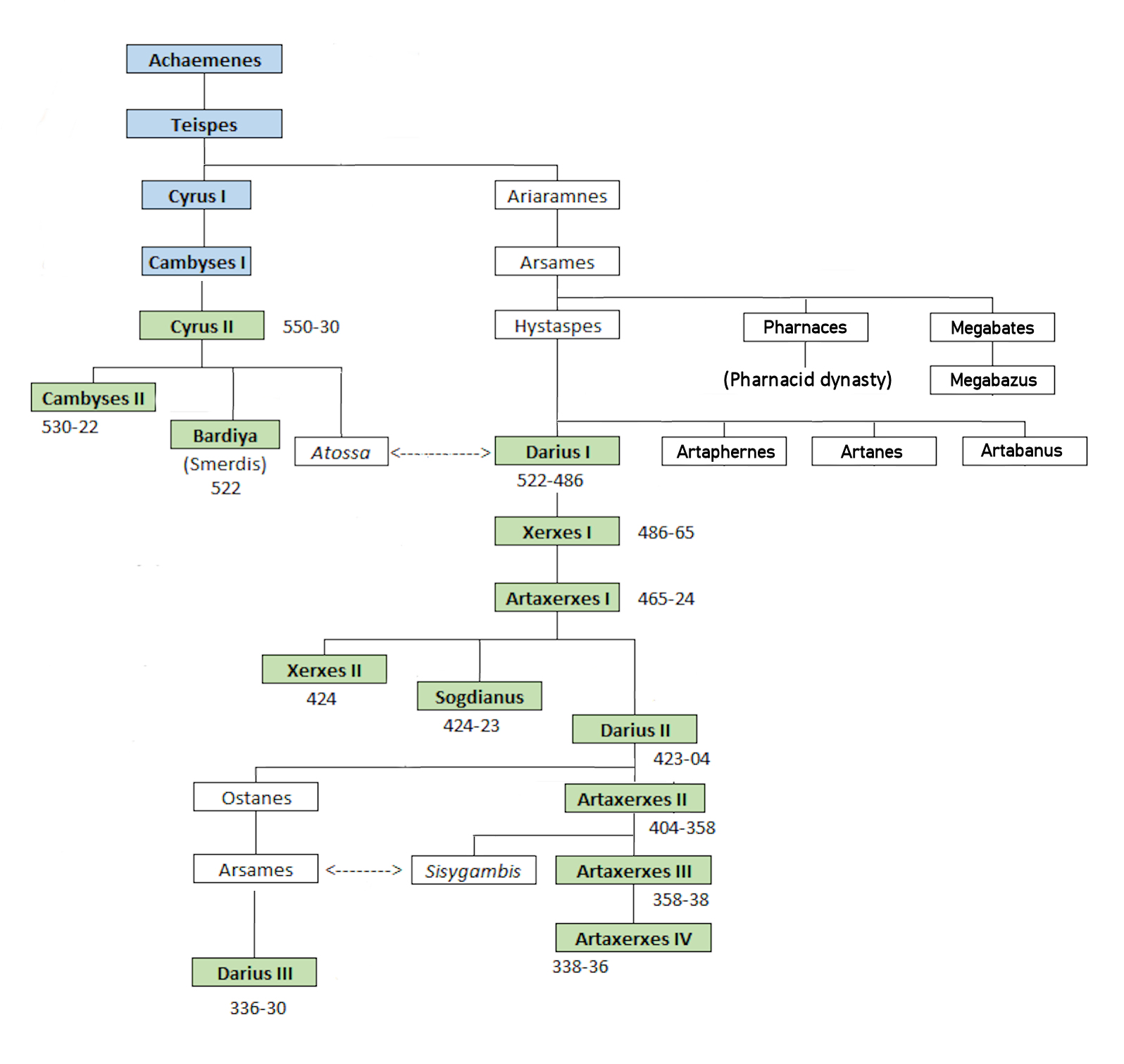
- Megabazus was son of Megabates.
- Children: Megabates; Oebares II; Bubares; Pherendates
- Relatives: Megabates (father)
- Military career
- Allegiance: Achaemenid Empire
- Conflicts: European Scythian campaign of Darius I Darius' Thracian campaign Unknown others

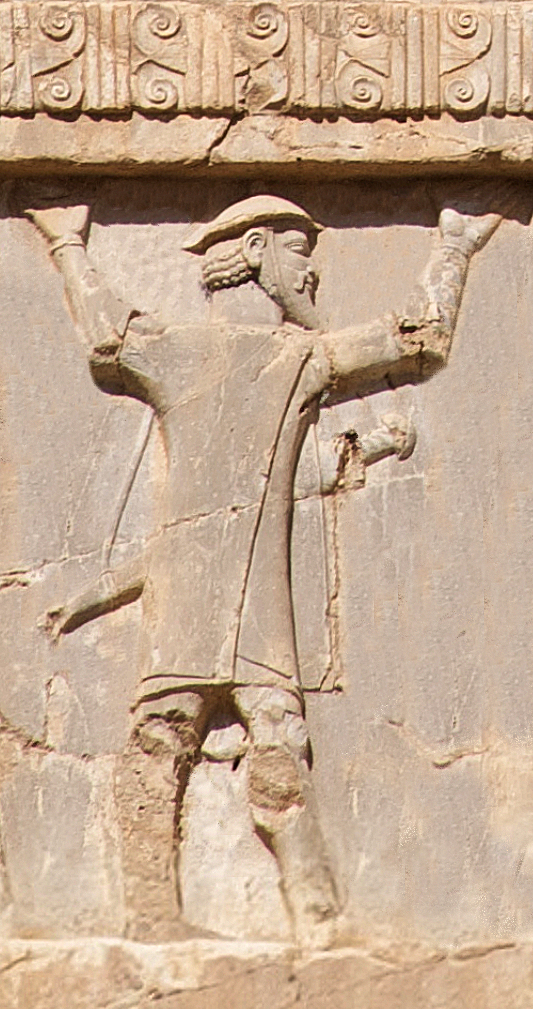
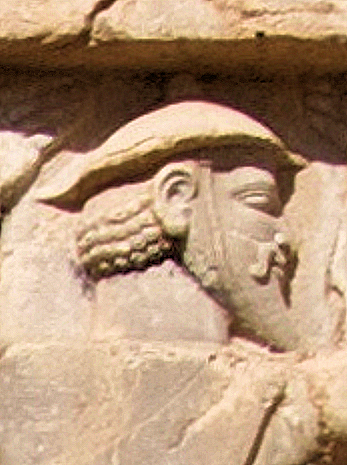
Macedonians were part of the Achaemenid army after the submission obtained by Megabazus. The "Ionians with shield-hats" (Old Persian cuneiform: 𐎹𐎢𐎴𐎠𐏐𐎫𐎣𐎲𐎼𐎠, Yaunā takabarā) depicted on the tomb of Xerxes I at Naqsh-e Rustam, were probably Macedonian soldiers in the service of the Achaemenid army, wearing the petasos or kausia, c.480 BC.

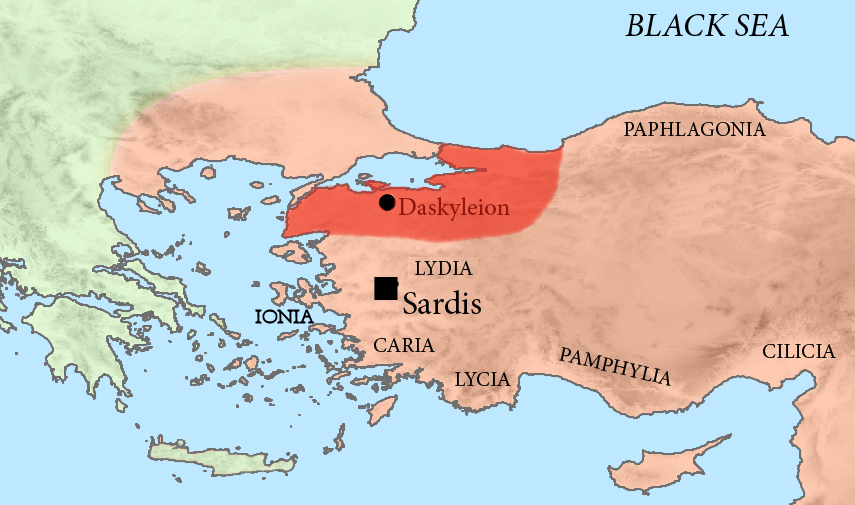
Megabazus became satrap of Hellespontine Phrygia.

Megabazus (Old Persian: Bagavazdā or Bagabāzu; Ancient Greek: Μεγαβάζος and Μεγάβυζος), son of Megabates, was a highly regarded Persian general under Darius, to whom he was a first-degree cousin. Most information about Megabazus comes from The Histories by Herodotus.

== Scythian campaign (513 BC) ==
Megabazus led the army of Persian King Darius I in 513 BC during his European Scythian campaign. After this campaign was discontinued without result, Megabazus remained commander-in-chief of an 80,000-man army in Europe with the mission of subjugating the Greek cities on the Hellespont. The Persian troops first subdued gold-rich Thrace after capturing Perinthos and the coastal Greek cities, then defeated the powerful Paeonians, many of whom he deported to Phrygia.

== Subjugation of Macedon ==
Finally, Megabazus sent envoys to Amyntas I, king of Macedon, demanding acceptance of Persian domination, which the king accepted. Megabazus received the present of "Earth and Water" from Amyntas, which symbolised submission to the Achaemenid emperor. Amyntas then acted as hyparch to Darius I.

Disagreements arose when members of the Persian delegation insulted the Macedonians by fraternising with their wives. The Macedonian prince Alexander I reacted by murdering several Persian diplomats and their followers. The conflict was later settled by the marriage of one of Megabazus's sons, Bubares, to the Macedonian princess Gygaia, a daughter of Amyntas.

After his return to Asia Minor, Megabazus received the governorship of the province (satrapy) of Hellespontine Phrygia and was based in its capital, Daskyleion.

== Rivalry with Histiaeus ==
Megabazus was suspicious of Histiaeus, tyrant of Miletus, and advised Darius to bring him to the Persian capital of Susa to keep a closer eye on him. His suspicions proved well founded: Histiaeus provoked a revolt in the town he formally governed and later sided with the Greeks against Persia. The successor to Megabazus' command was Otanes, son of Sisamnes.

== Family ==
According to Herodotus (Herodotus 6.33) Oebares was a son of Megabazus, and became satrap of Daskyleion (Hellespontine Phrygia) in 493 BC.

Megabates was another son of Megabazus. He commanded the Achaemenid fleet that sailed against Naxos in 500/499 BC. He was also satrap of Daskyleion in the early 470s.

=== Sons ===
- Oebares: became satrap of Daskyleion c. 493 BC
- Bubares: managing engineer of the Athos Canal of Xerxes I
- Megabates: Achaemenid fleet commander and satrap of Daskyleion
- Pherendates: died c. 485 BC while satrap of Egypt.

== See also ==
- Megabyzus
- Megabates
