= Dascylium =

Ancient site of a town in Anatolia

Coordinates: 40°07′44″N 28°04′18″E

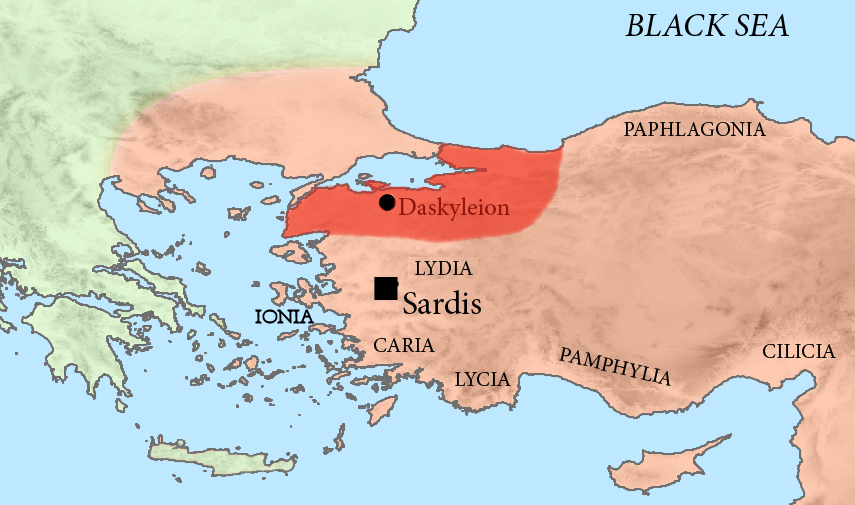
The location of Hellespontine Phrygia, and the provincial capital of Dascylium, in the Achaemenid Empire, c. 500 BC.

Dascylium, Dascyleium, or Daskyleion (Ancient Greek: Δασκύλιον, Δασκυλεῖον), also known as Dascylus, was a town in Anatolia some 30 kilometres (19 mi) inland from the coast of the Propontis, at modern Ergili, Turkey. Its site was rediscovered in 1952 and has since been excavated.

== History ==
=== Late Bronze Age ===
In mythology, the town existed at the time of the Trojan War. Excavations have shown that the site was inhabited in the Bronze Age.

=== Iron Age ===
==== Phrygian period ====
Phrygians settled the city in the first part of the millennium BCE. There are walls and the foundations of a Temple of Cybele.

==== Lydian period ====
In the 7th century BCE it came under the control of Lydia. It was then said to be named after Dascylus, the father of Gyges.

==== Persian period ====
After the Conquests of Cyrus the Great in 547 BC, Dascylium was chosen as the seat of the Persian satrapy of Hellespontine Phrygia, comprising lands of the Troad, Mysia and Bithynia.

==== Hellenistic period ====
Pharnabazus was satrap of Darius III there, until Alexander the Great appointed Calas, who was replaced by Arrhidaeus in the Treaty of Triparadisus. According to Strabo, Hellespontine Phrygia and Phrygia Epictetus comprised Lesser Phrygia (Mysia). Others geographers arranged it differently.

It was a member of the Delian League.

When Alexander of Macedon invaded Asia in 334 BC, the first of the major battles by which he overthrew the Achaemenid Empire was fought at the Granicus river on his way to Dascylium from Abydos on the coast.

== Christianity ==
=== Bishopric ===
Dascylium appears as a Christian bishopric in the mid-7th-century Notitia Episcopatuum of Pseudo-Epiphanius. It was a suffragan of the metropolitan see of Nicomedia, capital of the Roman province of Bithynia.

The first bishop of Dascylium whose name appears in an extant document is Ioannes, who took part in the Third Council of Constantinople in 680 and in the Trullan Council of 692. The priest Basilius acted as representative of an unnamed bishop of the see at the Second Council of Nicaea in 787. Georgius was at the Council of Constantinople (869) and Germanus at the Photian Council of Constantinople (879).

== Archaeology ==
In 2020, archaeologists found a 4th century BC terracotta mask, representing the god Dionysus, in the city’s acropolis. From 1988 to 2010 the excavations were directed by Tomris Bakır. In August 2021, archaeologists led by Kaan Iren have announced the discovery of Ancient relief described Greek-Persian wars at Dascylium. Explorer Kaan Iren said: "there are Greek soldiers fighting and Persians on horseback fighting them. Greek soldiers are depicted under the hoofs of Persian horses. There is a propaganda scene here under the pretext of war".

== See also ==
- Ancient sites of Balıkesir
