= Hemhem crown =

Ancient Egyptian ceremonial headgear

Hemhem
- The hemhem crown, based on depictions from antiquity

Details
- Country: Ancient Egypt, Nubia, Ancient Persia

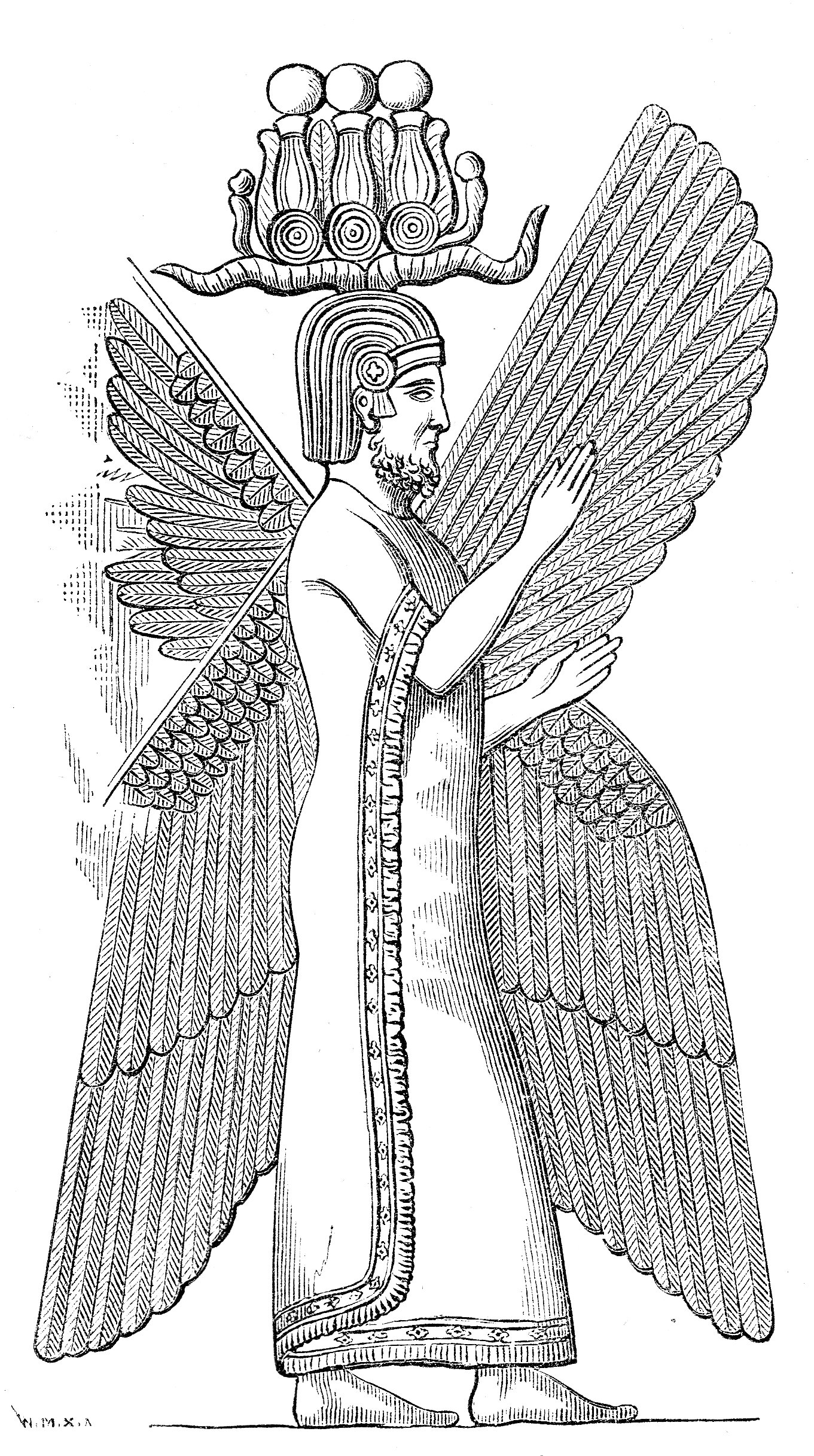
A winged figure in Elamite robes wearing a hemhem crown

Hemhem crown was an ancient Egyptian ceremonial headgear. The hemhem crown consisted of three atefs (which may be called a triple atef), two uraei, two ram's horns, and three to six solar disks. The first appearance of the hemhem crown is during the reign of Akhenaten in the 14th century BC, appearing as an alternative to the atef crown, and it underwent development between the 18th and 21st dynasties. Gods like Heka, Isis, and Osiris also appeared with the hemhem crown, and during the Greco-Roman period, solar deities were also depicted wearing it in some temples.

Later the hemhem crown was shown on the images of non-Egyptian rulers, such as Nubians Natakamani, Arnekhamani or Silko of Nobadia. A bas-relief at Pasargadae depicting a "Winged Figure" or "Winged Genius" with the hemhem crown indicates the proliferation of Egyptian paraphernalia. This evidence indicates that the hemhem crown had passed into Iranian iconography, likely through an intermediary as opposed to directly from Egyptian sources, this being usually identified as North Syrian or Phoenician art where it was commonly associated with divine beings.

== Etymology ==
The Egyptian word "hemhem" means "to shout", "cry out", possibly indicating that the hemhem crown represented a battle horn or war cry, although it was also donned on festive occasions.

== History ==
The hemhem crown was first seen in the 18th Dynasty, and was worn during significant ceremonies. The symbolic interpretation behind this crown was to boast the power of the Pharaoh. An early appearance of the hemhem crown was during the reign of Akhenaten as seen in a relief from his tomb at Amarna. Tutankhamun was depicted wearing the hemhem crown on the inlay of a throne found in his tomb. This crown was often depicted on kings during the Ptolemaic Dynasty.

The crown was eventually transplanted into Syrian and Iran contexts, where it underwent further adaptations in light of the political needs of the time. The Pasargadae figure depicted with the hemhem crown has been variously associated with many figures. In the past, it was more common to identify the figure with Cyrus the Great but more recent work indicates that this is not the case with identifications opting instead towards a god like Mithra or something between a man and a god. The depiction itself indicates the proliferation of Egyptian paraphernalia.

== Features ==
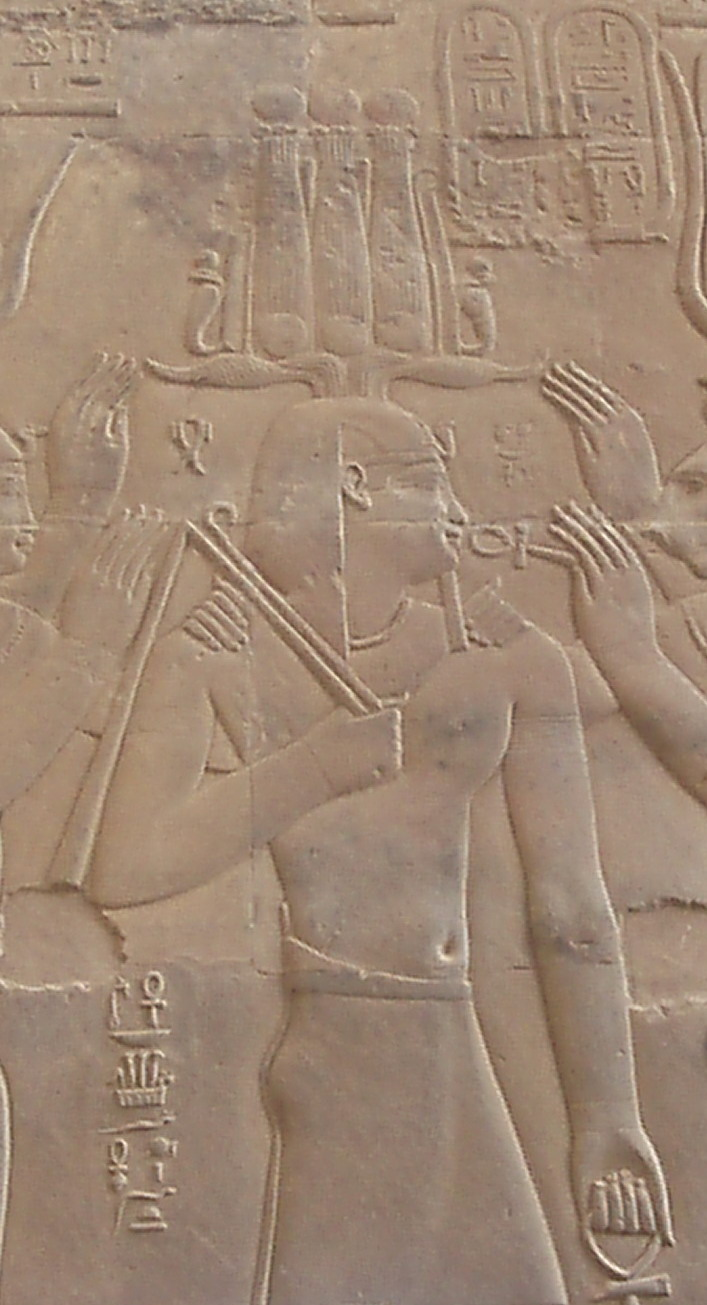
Ptolemy XII Auletes wearing a hemhem crown, from the temple of Kom Ombo

The crown is set on top of a pair of long spiral ram's horns, and it is commonly seen with a cobra on either side of the crown. It was created with reeds and ostrich feathers, along with feathers from many other birds. The hemhem was the Triple Rush Crown, and was worn tilted towards the back of the head – contrary to how crowns are normally worn.

Another type of hemhem crown has three falcon birds in place of the three sun disks. This type of crown signifies the reign over Lower Egypt; the combination of the sun disks and the falcon shows the power over Lower Egypt along with Upper Egypt. The hemhem crowns occur more frequently from the time of Ptolemy VI onwards. The symbols on the crown, such as reeds and uraeuses signify a later time period. The more intricate the carvings on the crown, the later the time period of the crown. Falcons and horn imagery are not part of the early Ptolemaic period and are rarely depicted in hieroglyphs during that time period. Many other features of the crown, such as feathers from different animals, are all found in different time periods. Each feather added on the hemhem crown has significance to its time period. The form of the crown was constantly changing according to the time period; different items would be added on or taken off, or the shape of the crown would change. The crown was often depicted along with the nemes – the striped headcloth – and just as each time period had its significance, so did the collaboration of the nemes and the hemhem crown.

== Gallery ==
Modern depiction of a pharaoh wearing a Nemes with a Hemhem crown on top

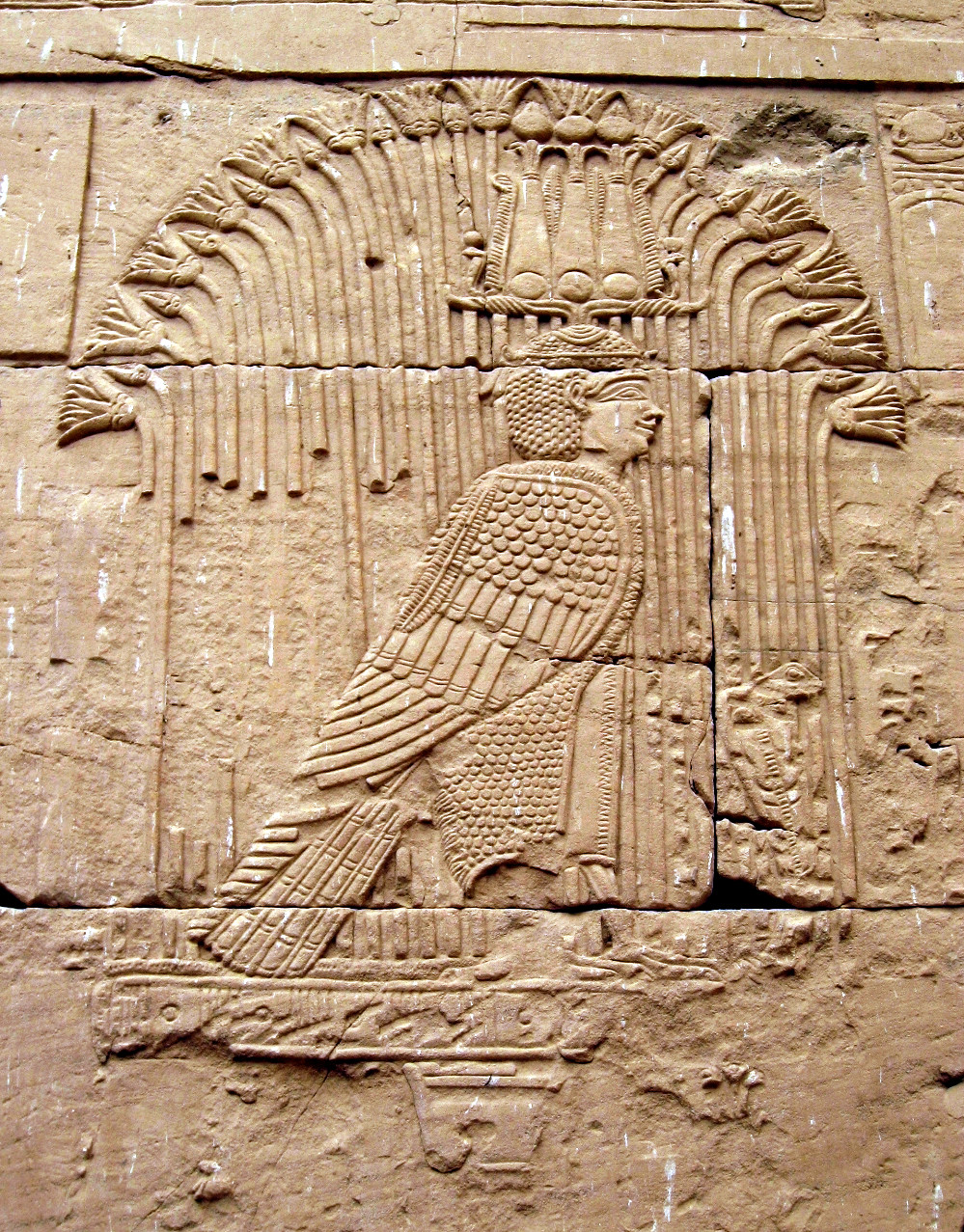
a relief of Mandulis, a god depicted with a hemhem crown

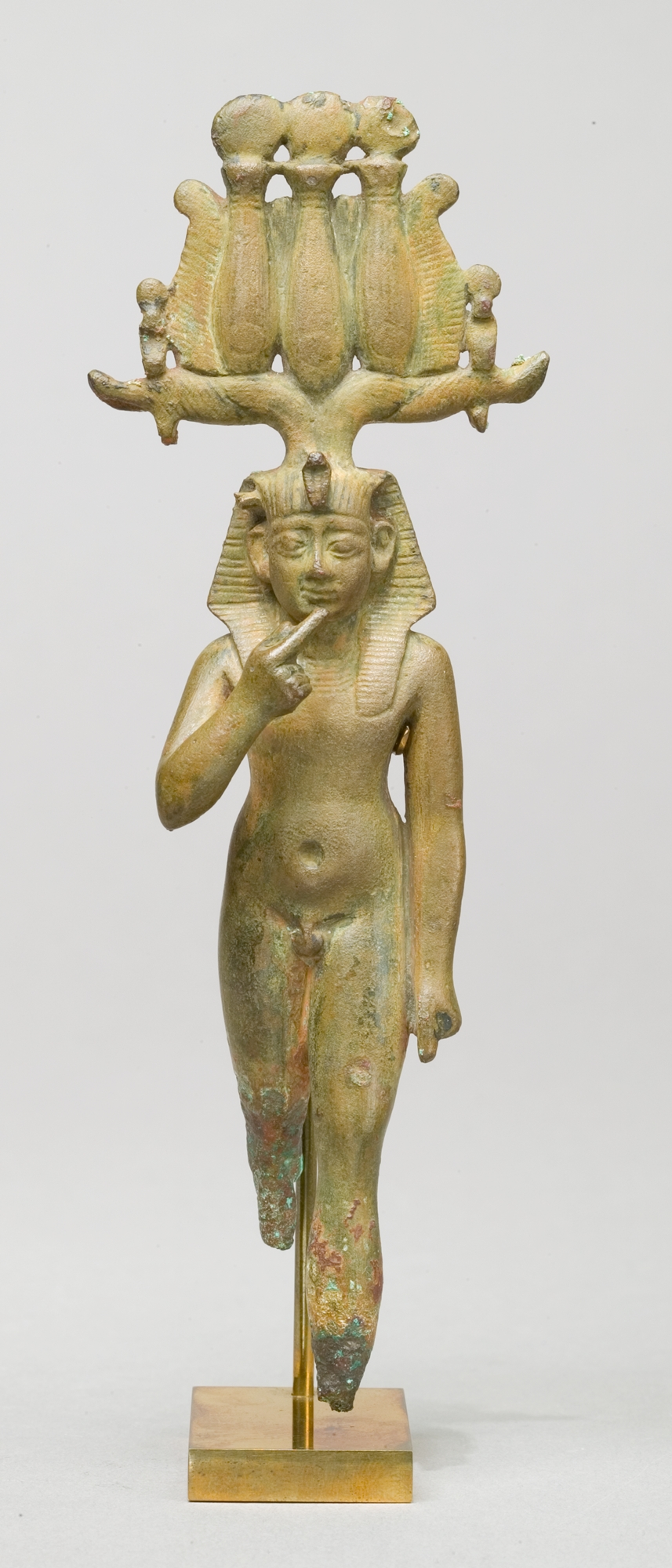
a status of a god wearing a hemhem crown, possibly Harpocrates

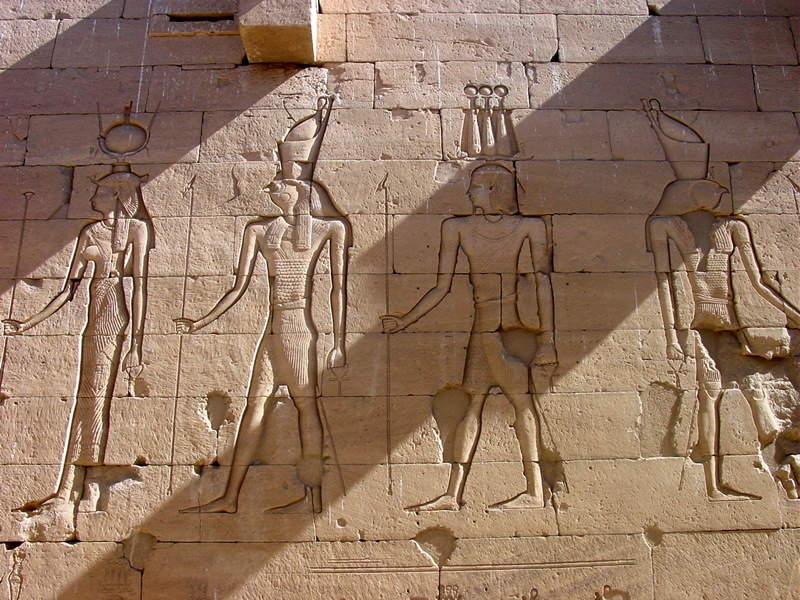
a relief from the temple of Kalabsha, the center right god is wearing a hemhem

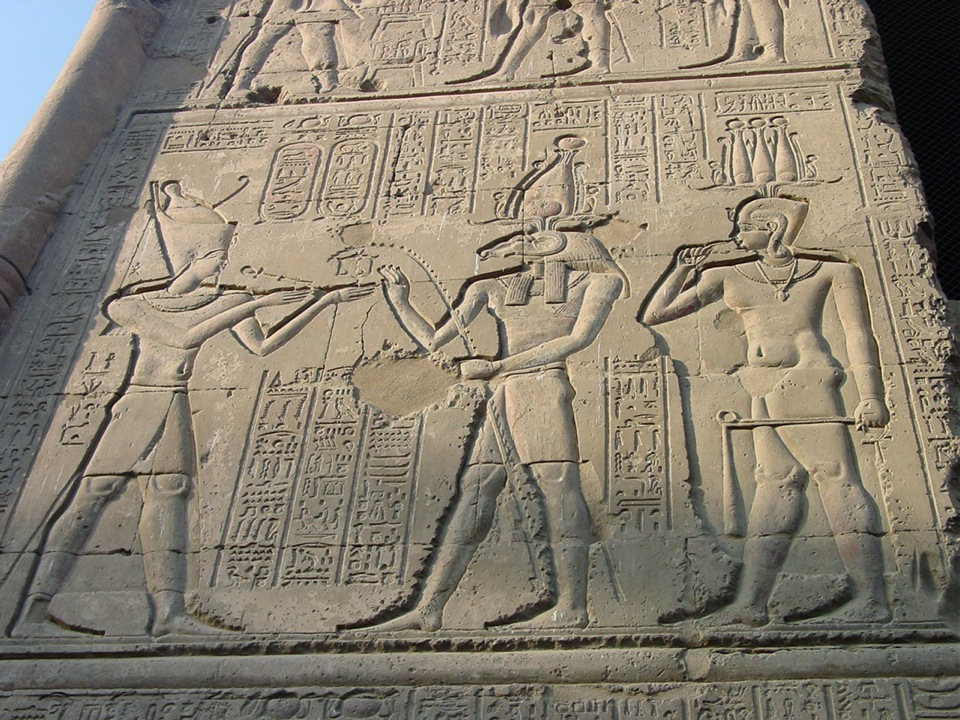
a relief from the temple of Esna. Heka, the rightmost god is wearing a hemhem

== See also ==
- Crowns of Egypt
- Horns of Alexander
- Horns of Ammon
