= Cyrus the Great =

Founder of the Achaemenid Empire

Cyrus the Great 𐎤𐎢𐎽𐎢𐏁
- King of Kings; King of the Four Corners of the World
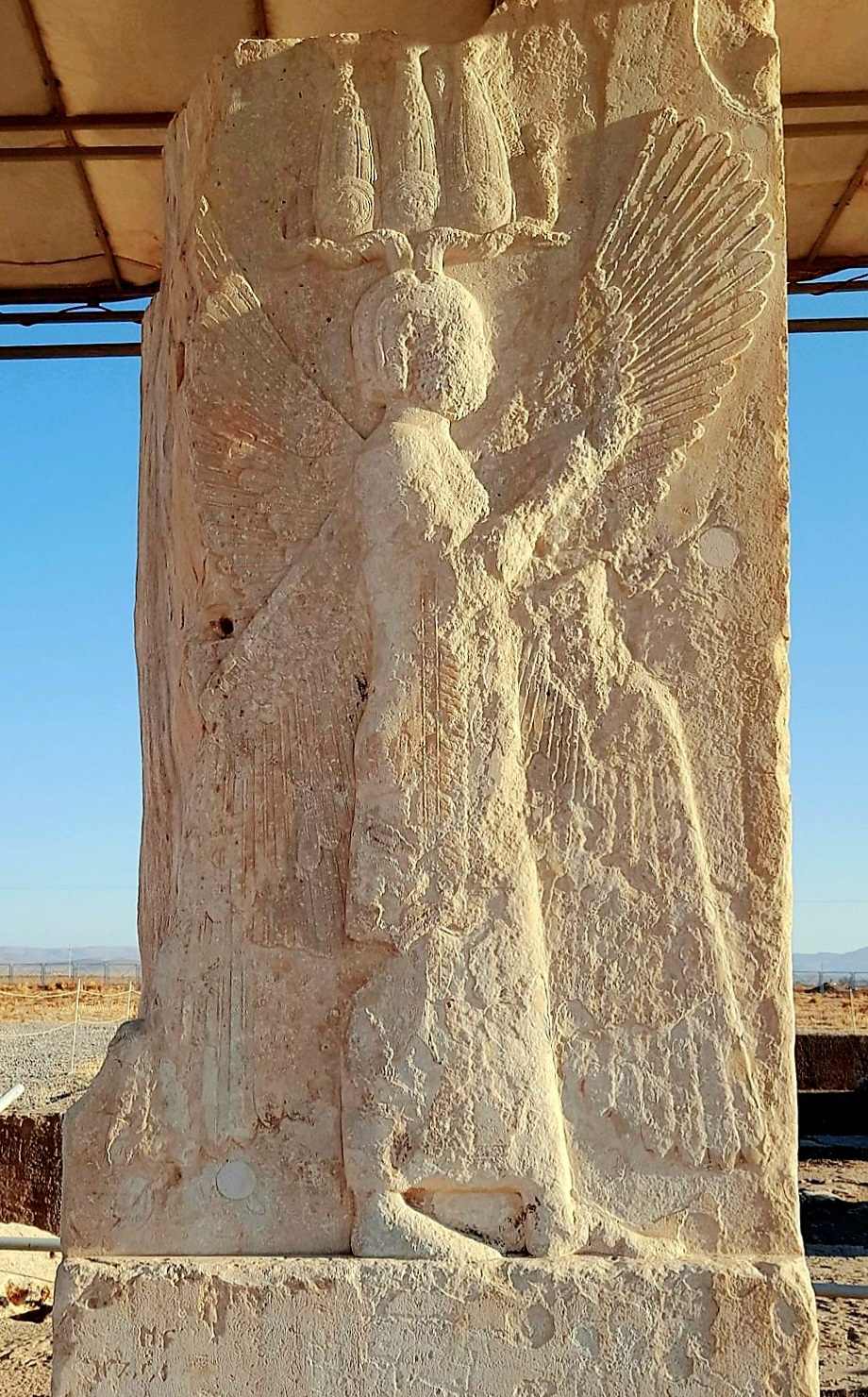
- Winged genie relief at Pasargadae, with braided hair and a Hemhem crown, which an old theory identified as Cyrus (Note: In more recent years, historians have moved away from identifying this figure with Cyrus the Great.)

Shahanshah of Persia
- Reign: 559–530 BC
- Predecessor: Cambyses I
- Successor: Cambyses II

King of Media
- Reign: 549–530 BC
- Predecessor: Astyages
- Successor: Cambyses II

King of Lydia
- Reign: 547–530 BC
- Predecessor: Croesus
- Successor: Cambyses II

King of Babylon
- Reign: 539–530 BC
- Predecessor: Nabonidus
- Successor: Cambyses II
- Born: c. 600 BC; Anshan, Persis, Kingdom of Anshan (now Fars, Iran)
- Died: 530 BC; Central Asia or Persia (disputed)
- Burial: Tomb of Cyrus the Great, Pasargadae, Iran
- Consort: Cassandane
- Issue: Cambyses II; Bardiya; Artystone; Atossa; Roxane
- House: Teispid
- Dynasty: Achaemenid
- Father: Cambyses I
Mother
Mandane of Media
Cyrus the Great
- Military career
- Conflicts: Conflicts: Wars of Cyrus the Great; Median Persian War; Battle of Hyrba; Battle of the Persian Border; Battle of Pasargadae (550bc); Lydian Persian War; Battle of Pteria; Battle of Thymbra; Battle of Sardis; Neo-Babylonian Persian War; Battle of Opis; Fall of Babylon

Cyrus II of Persia (Note: Old Persian: 𐎤𐎢𐎽𐎢𐏁 Kūruš; Image:) (c. 600 – 530 BC), commonly known as Cyrus the Great, was the founder of the Achaemenid Empire. Hailing from Persis, he brought the Achaemenid dynasty to power by defeating the Median Empire and embracing all of the previous civilized states of the ancient Near East, expanding vastly across most of West Asia and much of Central Asia to create what would soon become the largest empire in history at the time. The Achaemenid Empire's greatest territorial extent was achieved under Darius the Great, whose rule stretched from Southeast Europe and Northeast Africa in the west to the Indus Valley in the east.

After absorbing the Median Empire, Cyrus conquered Lydia and eventually the Neo-Babylonian Empire, granting him control of Anatolia and the Fertile Crescent, respectively. He also led a major expedition into Central Asia, where his army brought "into subjection every nation without exception" before he allegedly died in battle with the Massagetae, a nomadic Eastern Iranian people, along the Syr Darya in December 530 BC. (Note: Cyrus's date of death can be deduced from the last two references to his own reign (a tablet from Borsippa dated to 12 August and the final from Babylon 12 September 530 BC) and the first reference to the reign of his son Cambyses (a tablet from Babylon dated to 31 August and or 4 September), but an undocumented tablet from the city of Kish dates the last official reign of Cyrus to 4 December 530 BC; see R. A. Parker and W. H. Dubberstein, Babylonian Chronology 626 B.C. – A.D. 75, 1971.) However, according to Xenophon of Athens, Cyrus did not die fighting and had instead returned to the capital city of Pasargadae. He was succeeded by his son Cambyses II, whose campaigns led to the conquests of Egypt, Nubia, and Cyrenaica during his short reign.

To the Greeks, he was known as Cyrus the Elder and was particularly renowned among contemporary scholars because of his habitual policy of tolerance for peoples' customs and religions in the lands that he conquered. Similarly, he is exalted in Judaism for his role in freeing the Jewish people from the Babylonian captivity by issuing the Edict of Restoration following the Persian conquest of Babylon. This event is described in the Hebrew Bible as the return to Zion, whereby displaced Jews were repatriated to what had been the Kingdom of Judah, thus enabling the resurgence of Jewish sovereignty in the Land of Israel. Cyrus also facilitated Jewish aspirations for a new Temple in Jerusalem in the Achaemenid Empire's province of Yehud, where the original Solomon's Temple had once stood before being destroyed during the Babylonian siege of Jerusalem. His efforts resulted in the completion of the Second Temple, which marked the beginning of the Second Temple period and Second Temple Judaism. According to the Book of Isaiah, he was anointed by Yahweh and explicitly designated "messiah" for this task; Cyrus is the only non-Jewish figure to be revered in this capacity.

In addition to his influence on traditions in both the East and the West, Cyrus is recognized for his achievements in politics and military strategy. He was influential in developing the system of a central administration at his capital city to govern the Achaemenid Empire's satraps, who worked for the profit of both rulers and subjects. His realm's prestige in the ancient world would gradually reach as far west as Athens, where upper-class Greeks adopted aspects of the culture of the ruling Persian class as their own. Likewise, Cyrus's reign played a crucial role in defining the history of Iran for well over a millennium, as future Persian empires often viewed the Achaemenid era with deference and as the ideal example to emulate. His dynasty was also instrumental in allowing Zoroastrianism to develop and spread as far east as China. To this end, he remains a cult figure in modern Iran, with his Pasargadae tomb serving as a spot of reverence for millions of the country's citizens.

== Etymology ==
The name Cyrus is a Latinized form derived from the Greek-language name Κῦρος (Kỹros), which itself was derived from the Old Persian name Kūruš. The name and its meaning have been recorded within ancient inscriptions in different languages. The ancient Greek historians Ctesias and Plutarch stated that Cyrus was named from the Sun (Kuros), a concept which has been interpreted as meaning "like the Sun" (Khurvash) by noting its relation to the Persian noun for Sun, khor, while using -vash as a suffix of likeness. Karl Hoffmann has suggested a translation based on the meaning of an Indo-European root "to humiliate", and accordingly, the name "Cyrus" means "humiliator of the enemy in verbal contest". Another possible Iranian derivation would mean "the young one, child", similar to Kurdish kur ("son, little boy") or Ossetian i-gur-un ("to be born") and kur (young bull). In the Persian language and especially in Iran, Cyrus's name is spelled as کوروش (Kūroš, [kuːˈɾoʃ]). In the Bible, he is referred to in the Hebrew language as Koresh (כורש). Some pieces of evidence suggest that Cyrus is Kay Khosrow, a legendary Persian king of the Kayanian dynasty and a character in Shahnameh, a Persian epic.

Some scholars, however, believe that neither Cyrus nor Cambyses were Iranian names, proposing that Cyrus was Elamite in origin and that the name meant "he who bestows care" in the extinct Elamite language. One reason is that, while Elamite names may end in -uš, no Elamite texts spell the name this way – only Kuraš. Meanwhile, Old Persian did not allow names to end in -aš, so it would make sense for Persian speakers to change an original Kuraš into the more grammatically correct form Kuruš. Elamite scribes, on the other hand, would not have had a reason to change an original Kuraš into Kuruš, since both forms were acceptable. Therefore, Kuraš probably represents the original form. Another scholarly opinion is that Kuruš was a name of Indo-Aryan origin, in honour of the Indo-Aryan Kuru and Kamboja mercenaries from eastern Afghanistan and northwest India that helped in the conquest of the Middle East. (Note: Kuraš is also attested as an Elamite name before Cyrus's lifetime.)

== Dynastic history ==
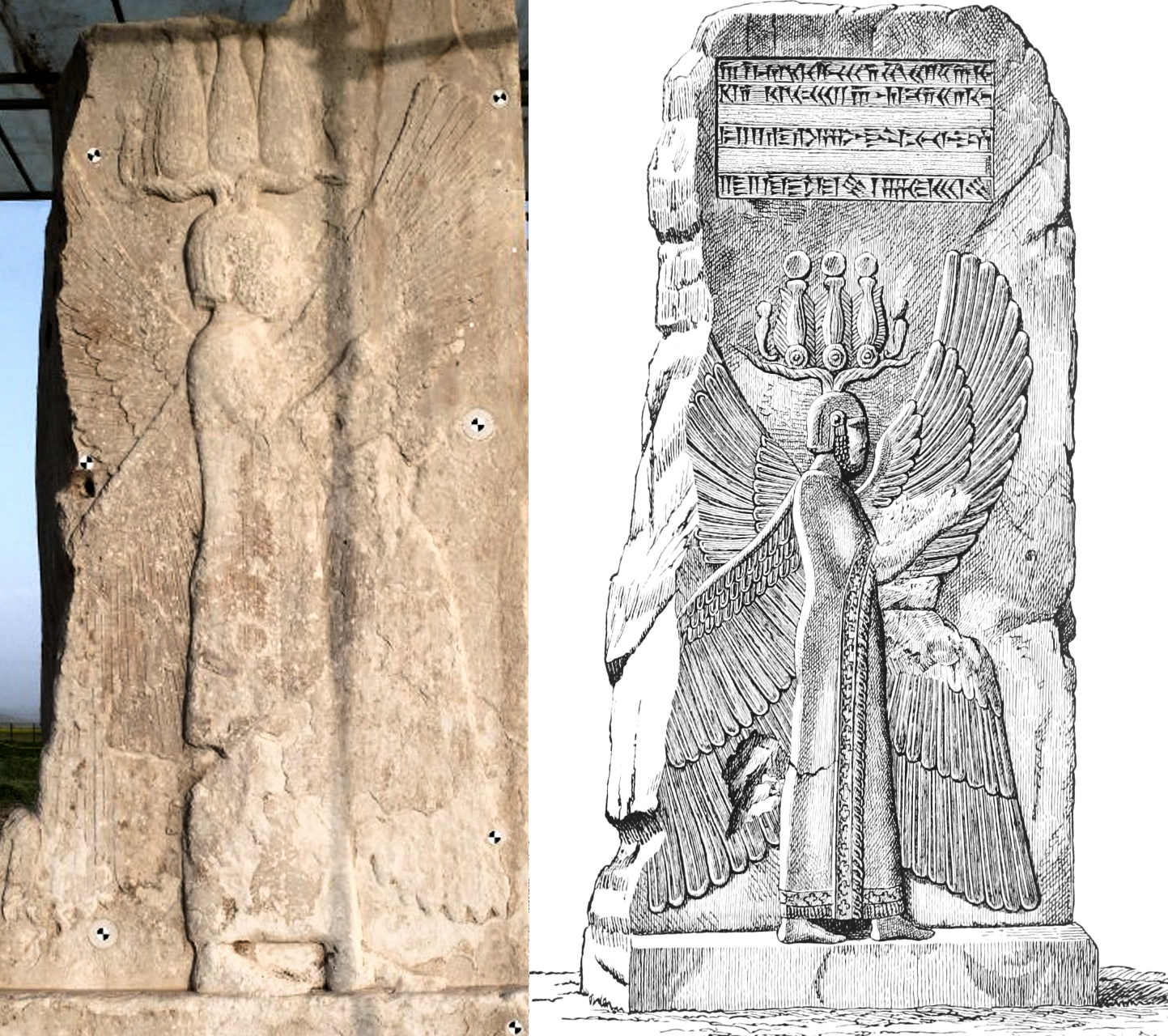
The four-winged guardian figure that may depict Cyrus, known from a bas-relief on a doorway pillar from Pasargadae. An inscription says "I am Cyrus the King, an Achaemenian." Scholars doubting that it depicts Cyrus note the inscription was inscribed in a later period and that the same inscription is found on other palaces in the complex.

Standard of Cyrus the Great (Derafsh Shahbaz), founder of the Achaemenid Empire, featuring the Shahbaz (see List of Iranian flags)

The Persian domination and kingdom in the Iranian plateau started as an extension of the Achaemenid dynasty, who expanded their earlier dominion possibly from the 9th century BC onward. The eponymous founder of the dynasty was Achaemenes (from Old Persian Haxāmaniš). Achaemenids are "descendants of Achaemenes", as Darius the Great, the ninth king of the dynasty, traced his ancestry to him, declaring "for this reason, we are called Achaemenids". Achaemenes built the state of Parsumash in the southwest of Iran and was succeeded by Teispes, who took the title "King of Anshan" after seizing the city Anshan and enlarging his kingdom further to include Pars proper. Ancient documents mention that Teispes had a son called Cyrus I, who also succeeded his father as "king of Anshan". Cyrus I had a full brother whose name is recorded as Ariaramnes.

In 600 BC, Cyrus I was succeeded by his son, Cambyses I, who reigned until 559 BC. Cyrus II "the Great" was the son of Cambyses I, who had named his son after his father, Cyrus I. There are several inscriptions of Cyrus the Great and later kings that refer to Cambyses I as the "great king" and "king of Anshan". Among these are some passages in the Cyrus cylinder where Cyrus calls himself "son of Cambyses, great king, king of Anshan". Another inscription (from CM's) mentions Cambyses I as a "mighty king" and "an Achaemenian", which according to the bulk of scholarly opinion was engraved under Darius and considered as a later forgery by Darius. However, Cambyses II's maternal grandfather Pharnaspes is named by historian Herodotus as "an Achaemenian". Xenophon's account in his Cyropædia names Cambyses's wife as Mandane and mentions Cambyses as king of Iran (ancient Persia). These agree with Cyrus's own inscriptions, as Anshan and Parsa were different names for the same land. These also agree with other non-Iranian accounts, except on one point from Herodotus which states that Cambyses was not a king but a "Persian of good family". However, in some other passages, Herodotus's account is wrong also on the name of the son of Chishpish, which he mentions as Cambyses but according to modern scholars, should be Cyrus I.

The traditional view based on archaeological research and the genealogy given in the Behistun inscription and by Herodotus holds that Cyrus the Great was an Achaemenid. However, M. Waters has suggested that Cyrus is unrelated to the Achaemenids or Darius the Great, and that his family was of Teispid and Anshanite origin instead of Achaemenid.

=== Titles ===
His regal titles in full were The Great King, King of Persia, King of Anshan, King of Media, King of Babylon, King of Sumer and Akkad, and King of the Four Corners of the World. The Nabonidus Chronicle notes the change in his title from "King of Anshan" to "King of Persia". Assyriologist François Vallat wrote that "When Astyages marched against Cyrus, Cyrus is called 'King of Anshan", but when Cyrus crosses the Tigris on his way to Lydia, he is 'King of Persia.' The coup therefore took place between these two events."

=== Family tree ===
Cyrus family tree

Achaemenes King of Persia
Teispes King of Persia
Ariaramnes Ruler of Persia (Note: Unconfirmed rulers, due to the Behistun Inscription) | Cyrus I Ruler of Anshan
Arsames Ruler of Persia | Cambyses I Ruler of Anshan
Hystaspes Prince | Cyrus the Great (Cyrus II) King of Persia
Darius the Great (Darius I) King of Persia | Cambyses II King of Persia | Bardiya (Smerdis) Prince (imposter Gaumata ruled as Smerdis) | Artystone Princess | Atossa Princess

== Early and personal life ==
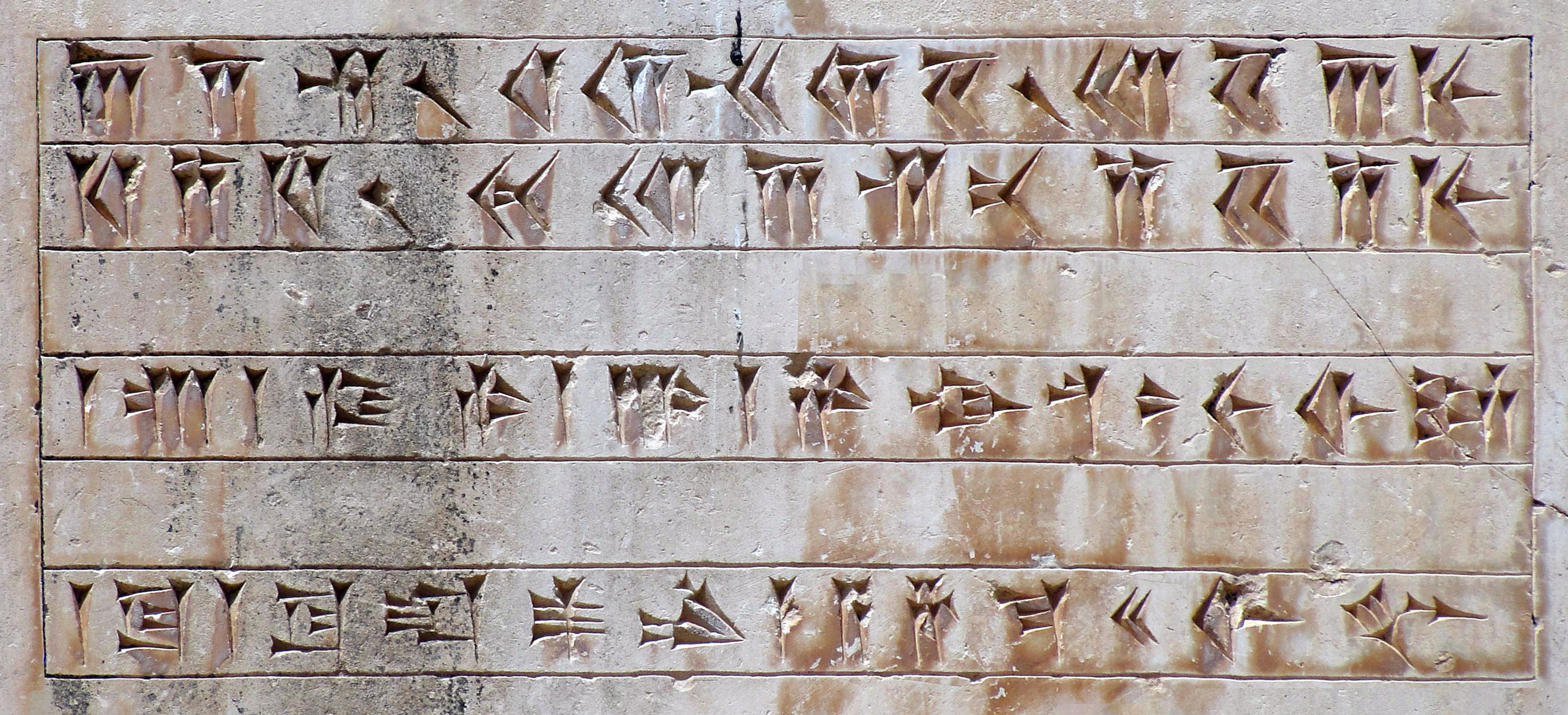
"I am Cyrus the King, an Achaemenian" in Old Persian, Elamite and Akkadian languages. It is known as the "CMa inscription", carved in a column of Palace P in Pasargadae. These inscriptions on behalf of Cyrus were probably made later by Darius I in order to affirm his lineage, using the Old Persian script he had designed.

Cyrus was born to Cambyses I, King of Anshan, and Mandane, daughter of Astyages, King of Media, during the period of 600–599 BC.

By his own account, generally believed now to be accurate, Cyrus was preceded as king by his father Cambyses I, grandfather Cyrus I, and great-grandfather Teispes. Cyrus married Cassandane who was an Achaemenian and the daughter of Pharnaspes. Cassandane bore him two sons, Cambyses II and Bardiya along with three daughters, Atossa, Artystone, and Roxane. Cyrus and Cassandane were known to love each other very much – Cassandane said that she found it more bitter to leave Cyrus than to depart her life. After her death, Cyrus insisted on public mourning throughout the kingdom. The Nabonidus Chronicle states that Babylonia mourned Cassandane for six days (identified as 21–26 March 538 BC). After his father's death, Cyrus inherited the Persian throne at Pasargadae, which was a vassal of Astyages. The Greek historian Strabo has said that Cyrus was originally named Agradates by his step-parents. It is possible that, when reuniting with his original family, following the naming customs, Cyrus's father, Cambyses I, named him Cyrus after his grandfather, who was Cyrus I. There is also an account by Strabo that claimed Agradates adopted the name Cyrus after the Cyrus river near Pasargadae.

=== Mythology ===
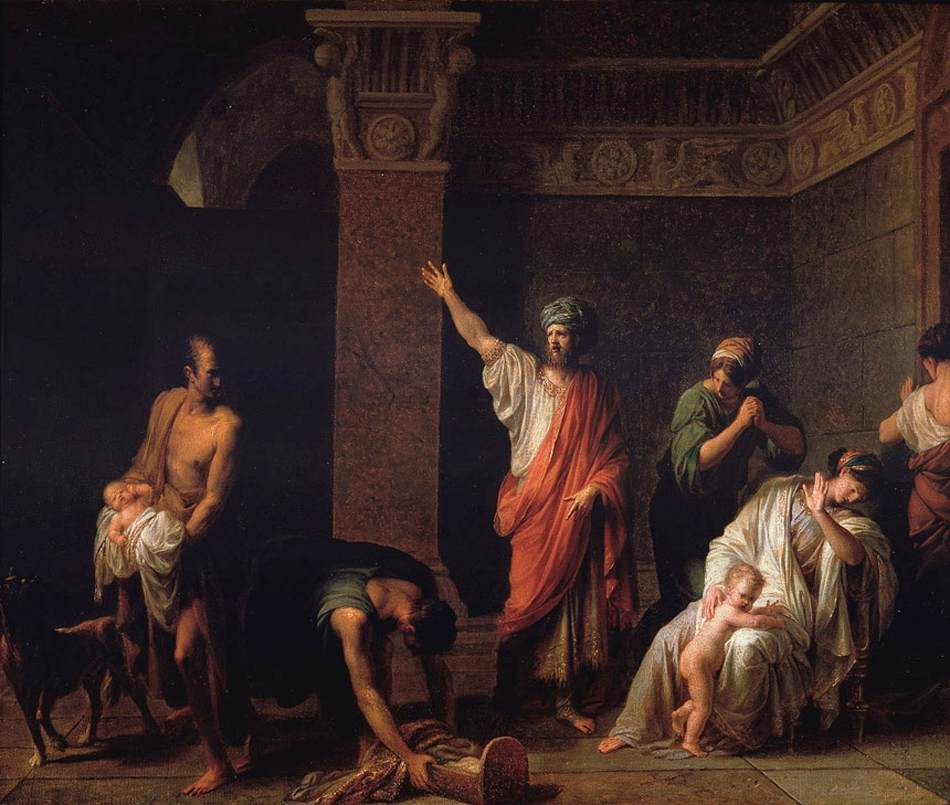
Painting by Jean-Charles Nicaise Perrin of king Astyages sending Harpagus to kill young Cyrus

Herodotus gave a mythological account of Cyrus's early life. In this account, Astyages had two prophetic dreams in which a flood, and then a series of fruit-bearing vines, emerged from his daughter Mandane's pelvis, and covered the entire kingdom. These were interpreted by his advisers as a foretelling that his grandson would one day rebel and supplant him as king. Astyages summoned Mandane, at the time pregnant with Cyrus, back to Ecbatana to have the child killed. His general Harpagus delegated the task to Mithradates, one of the shepherds of Astyages, who raised the child and passed off his stillborn son to Harpagus as the dead infant Cyrus.

Cyrus lived in secrecy, but when he reached the age of 10, during a childhood game, he had the son of a nobleman beaten when he refused to obey Cyrus's commands. As it was unheard of for the son of a shepherd to commit such an act, Astyages had the boy brought to his court, and interviewed him and his adoptive father. Upon the shepherd's confession, Astyages sent Cyrus back to Persia to live with his biological parents. However, Astyages summoned the son of Harpagus, and in retribution, chopped him to pieces, roasted some portions while boiling others, and tricked his adviser into eating his child during a large banquet. Following the meal, Astyages's servants brought Harpagus the head, hands and feet of his son on platters, so he could realize his inadvertent cannibalism.

== Rise to power ==
=== Succession to Media ===
Cyrus the Great succeeded to the throne in 559 BC following his father's death; however, Cyrus was not yet an independent ruler. Like his predecessors, Cyrus had to recognize Median overlordship. Astyages, last king of the Median Empire and Cyrus's grandfather, may have ruled over the majority of the Ancient Near East, from the Lydian frontier in the west to the lands of the Parthians and Persians in the east.

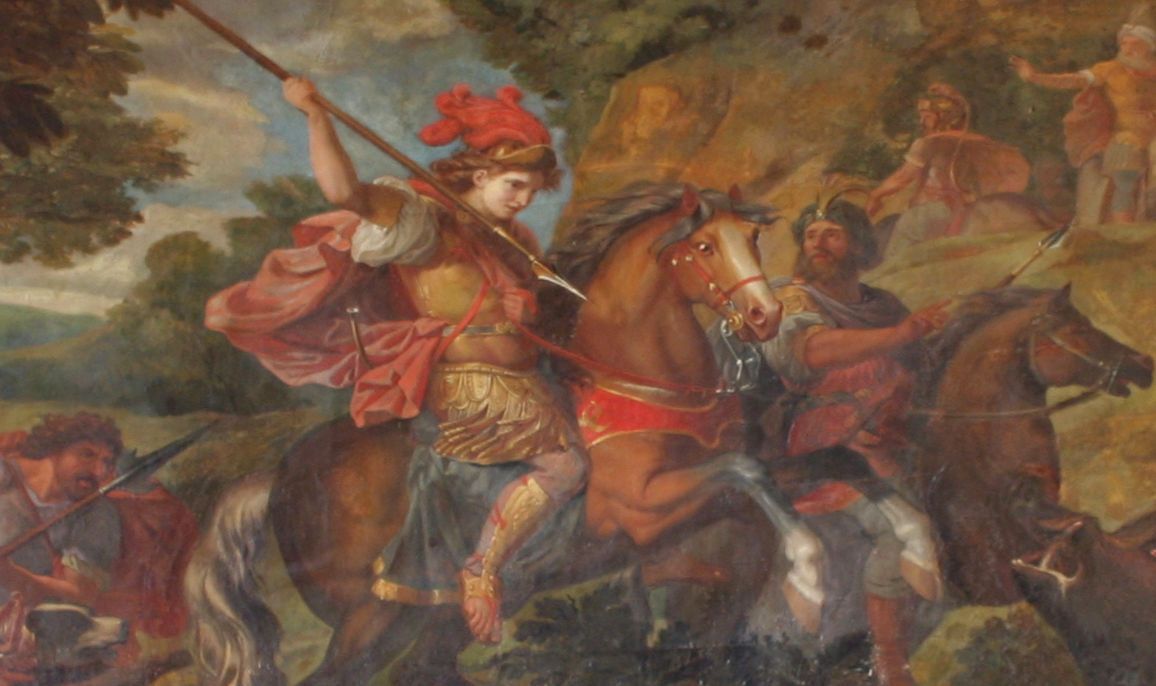
Detail of Cyrus Hunting Wild Boar by Claude Audran the Younger, Palace of Versailles

According to the Nabonidus Chronicle, Astyages launched an attack against Cyrus, "king of Ansan". According to the historian Herodotus, it is known that Astyages placed Harpagus in command of the Median army to conquer Cyrus. However, Harpagus contacted Cyrus and encouraged his revolt against Media, before eventually defecting along with several of the nobility and a portion of the army. This mutiny is confirmed by the Nabonidus Chronicle. The Chronicle suggests that the hostilities lasted for at least three years (553–550 BC), and the final battle resulted in the capture of Ecbatana. This was described in the paragraph that preceded the entry for Nabonidus's year 7, which detailed Cyrus's victory and the capture of his grandfather. According to the historians Herodotus and Ctesias, Cyrus spared the life of Astyages and married his daughter, Amytis. This marriage pacified several vassals, including the Bactrians, Parthians, and Saka. Cyrus also subdued and incorporated Sogdia into the empire during his military campaigns of 546–539 BC.

With Astyages out of power, all of his vassals (including many of Cyrus's relatives) were now under his command. His father's cousin Arsames, who had been the king of the city-state of Parsa under the Medes, therefore would have had to give up his throne. However, this transfer of power within the family seems to have been smooth, and it is likely that Arsames was still the nominal governor of Parsa under Cyrus's authority—more a Prince or a Grand Duke than a King. His son, Hystaspes, who was also Cyrus's second cousin, was then made satrap of Parthia and Phrygia. Cyrus the Great thus united the twin Achaemenid kingdoms of Parsa and Anshan into Persia proper. Arsames lived to see his grandson become Darius the Great, Shahanshah of Persia, after the deaths of both of Cyrus's sons. Cyrus's conquest of Media was merely the start of his wars.

=== Conquest of Lydia and Asia Minor ===
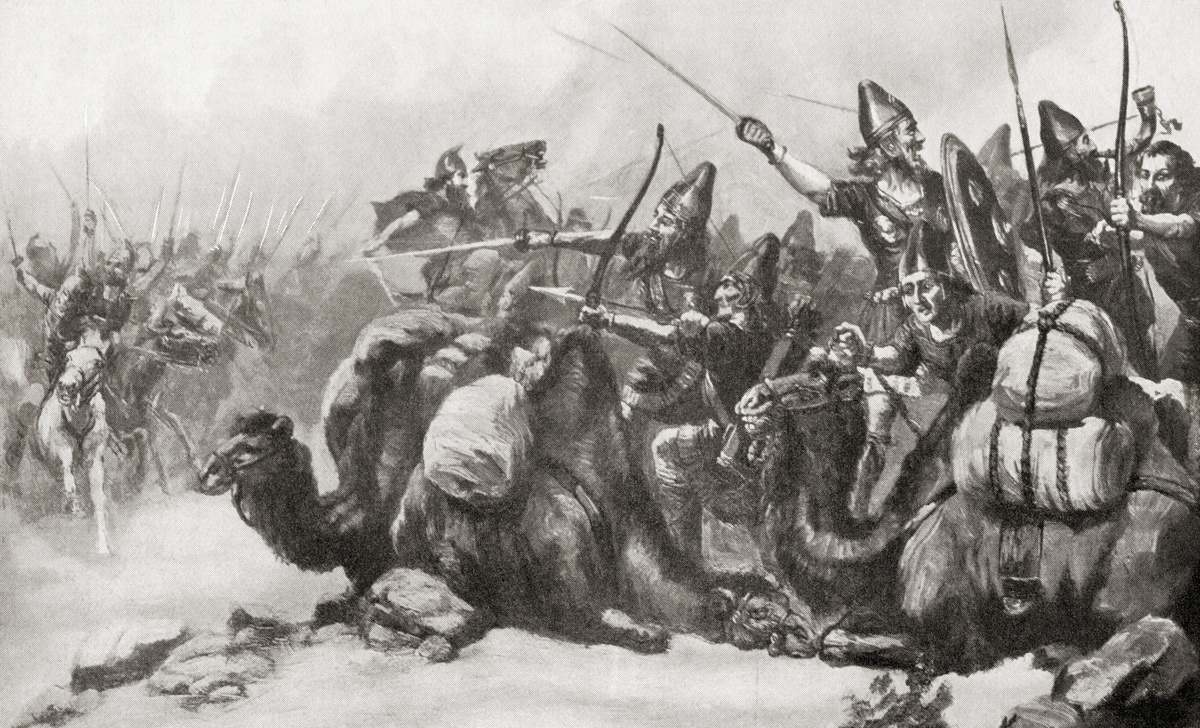
Victory of Cyrus over Lydia's Croesus at the Battle of Thymbra, 546 BC

The exact dates of the Lydian conquest are unknown, but it must have taken place between Cyrus's overthrow of the Median kingdom (550 BC) and his conquest of Babylon (539 BC). It was common in the past to give 547 BC as the year of the conquest due to some interpretations of the Nabonidus Chronicle, but this position is currently not much held. The Lydians first attacked the Achaemenid Empire's city of Pteria in Cappadocia. The king of Lydia Croesus besieged and captured the city enslaving its inhabitants. Meanwhile, the Persians invited the citizens of Ionia who were part of the Lydian kingdom to revolt against their ruler. The offer was rebuffed, and thus Cyrus levied an army and marched against the Lydians, increasing his numbers while passing through nations in his way. The Battle of Pteria was effectively a stalemate, with both sides suffering heavy casualties by nightfall. Croesus retreated to Sardis the following morning.

While in Sardis, Croesus sent out requests for his allies to send aid to Lydia. However, near the end of the winter, before the allies could unite, Cyrus the Great pushed the war into Lydian territory and besieged Croesus in his capital, Sardis. Shortly before the final Battle of Thymbra between the two rulers, Harpagus advised Cyrus the Great to place his dromedaries in front of his warriors; the Lydian horses, not used to the dromedaries' smell, would be very afraid. The strategy worked; the Lydian cavalry was routed. Cyrus defeated and captured Croesus. Cyrus occupied the capital at Sardis, conquering the Lydian kingdom in 546 BC. According to Herodotus, Cyrus the Great spared Croesus's life and kept him as an advisor, but this account conflicts with some translations of the contemporary Nabonidus Chronicle which interpret that the king of Lydia was slain.

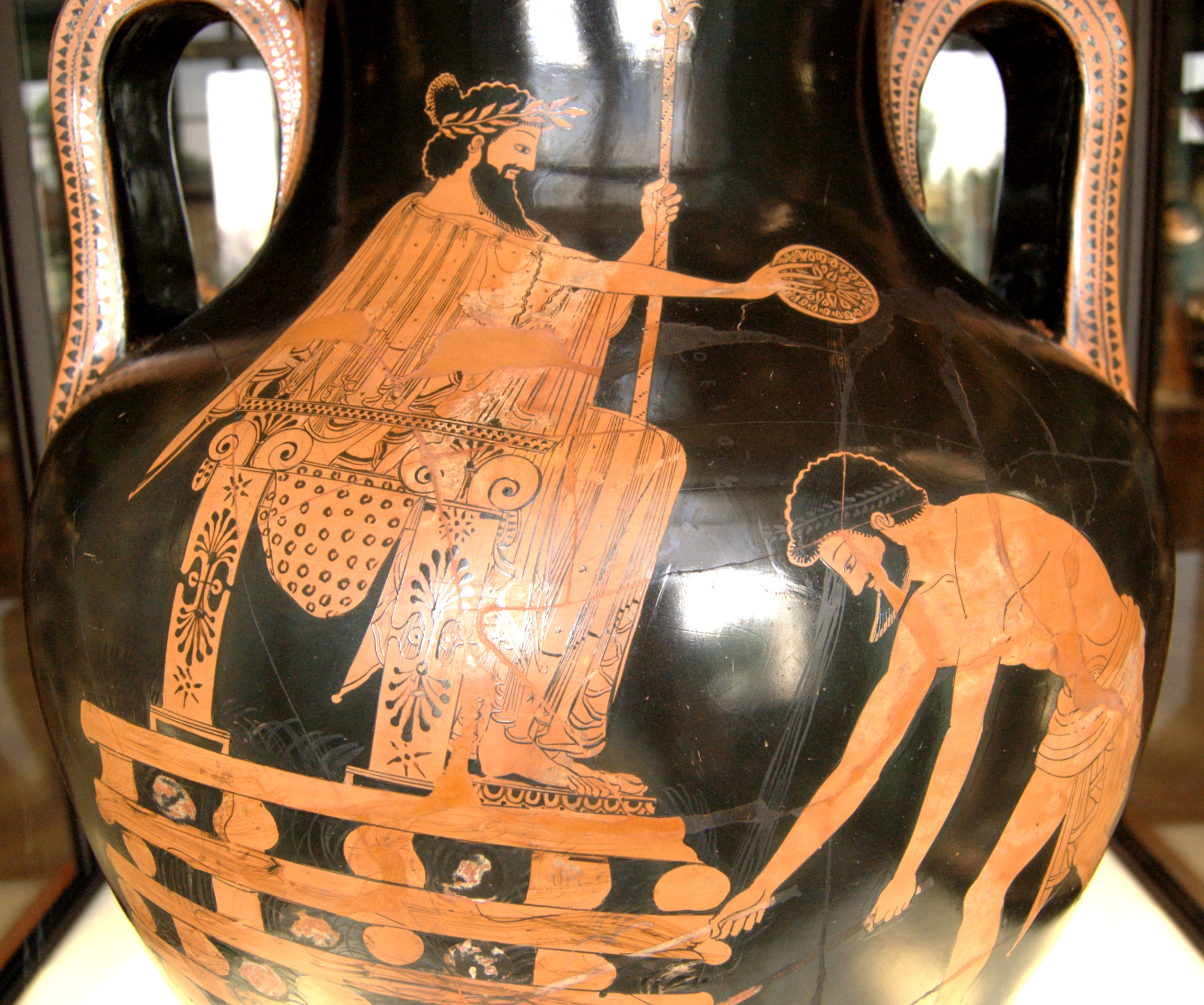
Croesus on the pyre. Attic red-figure amphora, 500–490 BC, Louvre (G 197)

Before Cyrus returned to the capital, Commagene was incorporated into Persia in 546 BC. Later, a Lydian named Pactyas was entrusted by Cyrus to send Croesus's treasury to Persia. However, soon after Cyrus's departure, Pactyas hired mercenaries and caused an uprising in Sardis, revolting against the Persian satrap of Lydia, Tabalus. Cyrus sent Mazares, one of his commanders, to subdue the insurrection but demanded that Pactyas be returned alive. Upon Mazares's arrival, Pactyas fled to Ionia, where he had hired more mercenaries. Mazares marched his troops into the Greek country and subdued the cities of Magnesia and Priene. The fate of Pactyas is unknown, but after capture, he was probably sent to Cyrus and put to death after being tortured.

Mazares continued the conquest of Asia Minor but died of unknown causes during his campaign in Ionia. Cyrus sent Harpagus to complete Mazares's conquest of Asia Minor. Harpagus captured Lycia, Aeolia and Caria, using the technique of building earthworks to breach the walls of besieged cities, a method unknown to the Greeks. He ended his conquest of the area in 542 BC and returned to Persia.

=== Conquests in Central and South Asia ===
After the conquest of Lydia, Cyrus campaigned in the east between around 545 BC to 540 BC. Cyrus first tried to conquer Gedrosia, however he was decisively defeated and departed Gedrosia. Gedrosia was most likely conquered during the reign of Darius I. After the failed attempt to conquer Gedrosia, Cyrus attacked the regions of Bactria, Arachosia, Sogdia, Saka, Chorasmia, Margiana and other provinces in the east. In 533 BC, Cyrus the Great crossed the Hindu Kush mountains and collected tribute from the Indus cities. Thus, Cyrus probably had established vassal states in western India. Cyrus then returned with his army to Babylon due to the unrest taking place in and around Babylon.

=== Conquest of the Neo-Babylonian Empire ===
By the year 540 BC, Cyrus captured Elam and its capital, Susa. The Nabonidus Chronicle records that, prior to the battle(s), the king of the Neo-Babylonian Empire, Nabonidus, had ordered cult statues from outlying Babylonian cities to be brought into the capital, suggesting that the conflict had begun possibly in the winter of 540 BC. Just before October 539 BC, Cyrus fought the Battle of Opis in or near the strategic riverside city of Opis on the Tigris, north of Babylon. The Babylonian army was routed, and on 10 October, Sippar was seized without a battle, with little to no resistance from the populace. It is probable that Cyrus engaged in negotiations with the Babylonian generals to obtain a compromise on their part and therefore avoid an armed confrontation. Nabonidus, who had retreated to Sippar following his defeat at Opis, fled to Borsippa.

Ancient Near East circa 540 BC, prior to the invasion of Babylon by Cyrus the Great

Around 12 October, Persian general Gubaru's troops entered Babylon, again without any resistance from the Babylonian armies, and detained Nabonidus. Herodotus explains that to accomplish this feat, the Persians, using a basin dug earlier by the Babylonian queen Nitokris to protect Babylon against Median attacks, diverted the Euphrates river into a canal so that the water level dropped "to the height of the middle of a man's thigh", which allowed the invading forces to march directly through the river bed to enter at night. Shortly thereafter, Nabonidus returned from Borsippa and surrendered to Cyrus. On 29 October, Cyrus entered the city of Babylon.

Prior to Cyrus's invasion of Babylon, the Neo-Babylonian Empire had conquered many kingdoms. In addition to Babylonia, Cyrus probably incorporated its sub-national entities into his Empire, including Syria, Judea, and Arabia Petraea, although there is no direct evidence to support this assumption.

After taking Babylon, Cyrus the Great proclaimed himself "king of Babylon, king of Sumer and Akkad, king of the four corners of the world" in the famous Cyrus Cylinder, an inscription on a cylinder that was deposited in the foundations of the Esagila temple dedicated to the chief Babylonian god, Marduk. The text of the cylinder denounces Nabonidus as impious and portrays the victorious Cyrus as pleasing the god Marduk. It describes how Cyrus had improved the lives of the citizens of Babylonia, repatriated displaced peoples, and restored temples and cult sanctuaries. Although some have asserted that the cylinder represents a form of human rights charter, historians generally portray it in the context of a long-standing Mesopotamian tradition of new rulers beginning their reigns with declarations of reforms.

Cyrus the Great's dominions composed the largest empire the world had ever seen to that point. At the end of Cyrus's rule, the Achaemenid Empire stretched from Asia Minor in the west to the Indus River in the east.

== Death ==
=== Conflicting narratives ===
The details of Cyrus's death vary by account. Ctesias, in his Persica, has the longest account, which says Cyrus met his death while putting down resistance from the Derbices infantry, aided by other Scythian archers and cavalry, plus Indians and their war elephants. According to him, this event took place northeast of the headwaters of the Syr Darya.

The account of Herodotus from his Histories provides the second-longest detail, in which Cyrus met his fate in a fierce battle with the Massagetae, a Scythian tribal confederation from the southern deserts of Khwarezm and Kyzyl Kum in the southernmost portion of the Eurasian Steppe regions of modern-day Kazakhstan and Uzbekistan, following the advice of Croesus to attack them in their own territory. The Massagetae were related to the Scythians in their dress and mode of living; they fought on horseback and on foot. In order to acquire her realm, Cyrus first sent an offer of marriage to their ruler, the queen Tomyris, a proposal she rejected.

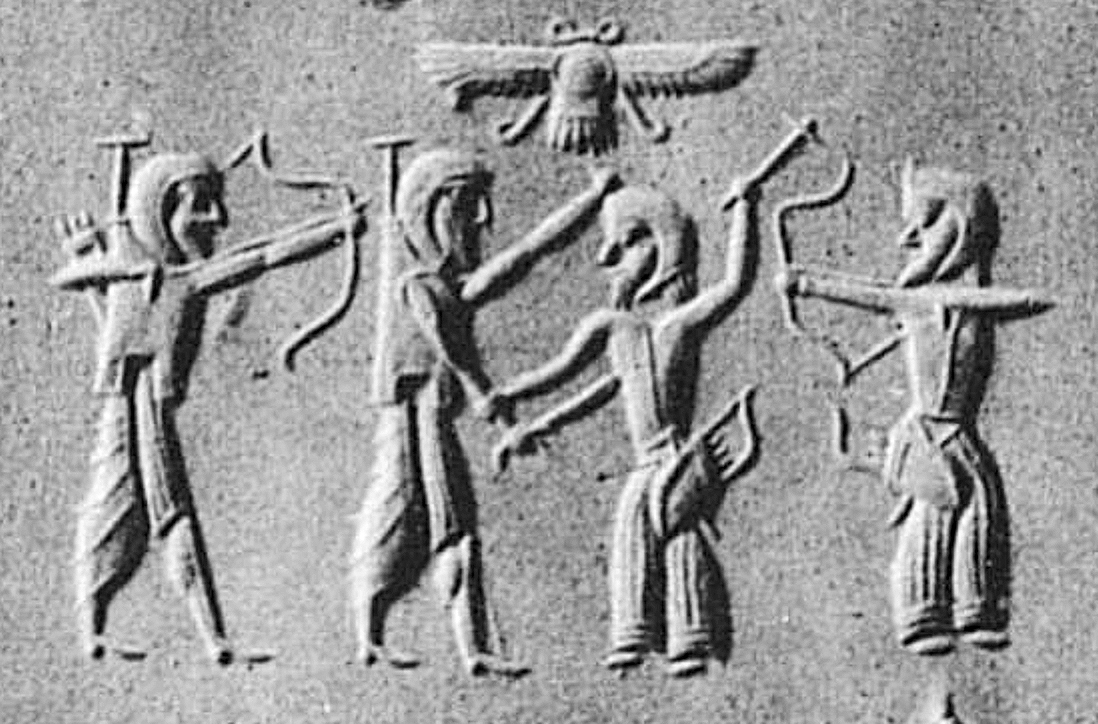
Achaemenid soldiers (left) fighting against Scythians, 5th century BC. Cylinder seal impression (drawing).

He then commenced his attempt to take Massagetae territory by force (c. 529 BC), beginning by building bridges and towered war boats along his side of the river Oxus, or Amu Darya, which separated them. Sending him a warning to cease his encroachment (a warning which she stated she expected he would disregard anyway), Tomyris challenged him to meet her forces in honorable warfare, inviting him to a location in her country a day's march from the river, where their two armies would formally engage each other. He accepted her offer, but, learning that the Massagetae were unfamiliar with wine and its intoxicating effects, he set up and then left camp with plenty of it behind, taking his best soldiers with him and leaving the least capable ones.

The general of Tomyris's army, Spargapises, who was also her son, and a third of the Massagetian troops, killed the group Cyrus had left there and, finding the camp well stocked with food and the wine, unwittingly drank themselves into inebriation, diminishing their capability to defend themselves when they were then overtaken by a surprise attack. They were successfully defeated, and, although he was taken prisoner, Spargapises committed suicide once he regained sobriety. Upon learning of what had transpired, Tomyris denounced Cyrus's tactics as underhanded and swore vengeance, leading a second wave of troops into battle herself. Cyrus the Great was ultimately killed, and his forces suffered massive casualties in what Herodotus referred to as the fiercest battle of his career and the ancient world. When it was over, Tomyris ordered the body of Cyrus brought to her, then decapitated him and dipped his head in a vessel of blood in a symbolic gesture of revenge for his bloodlust and the death of her son. However, some scholars question this version, mostly because even Herodotus admits this event was one of many versions of Cyrus's death that he heard from a supposedly reliable source who told him no one was there to see the aftermath.

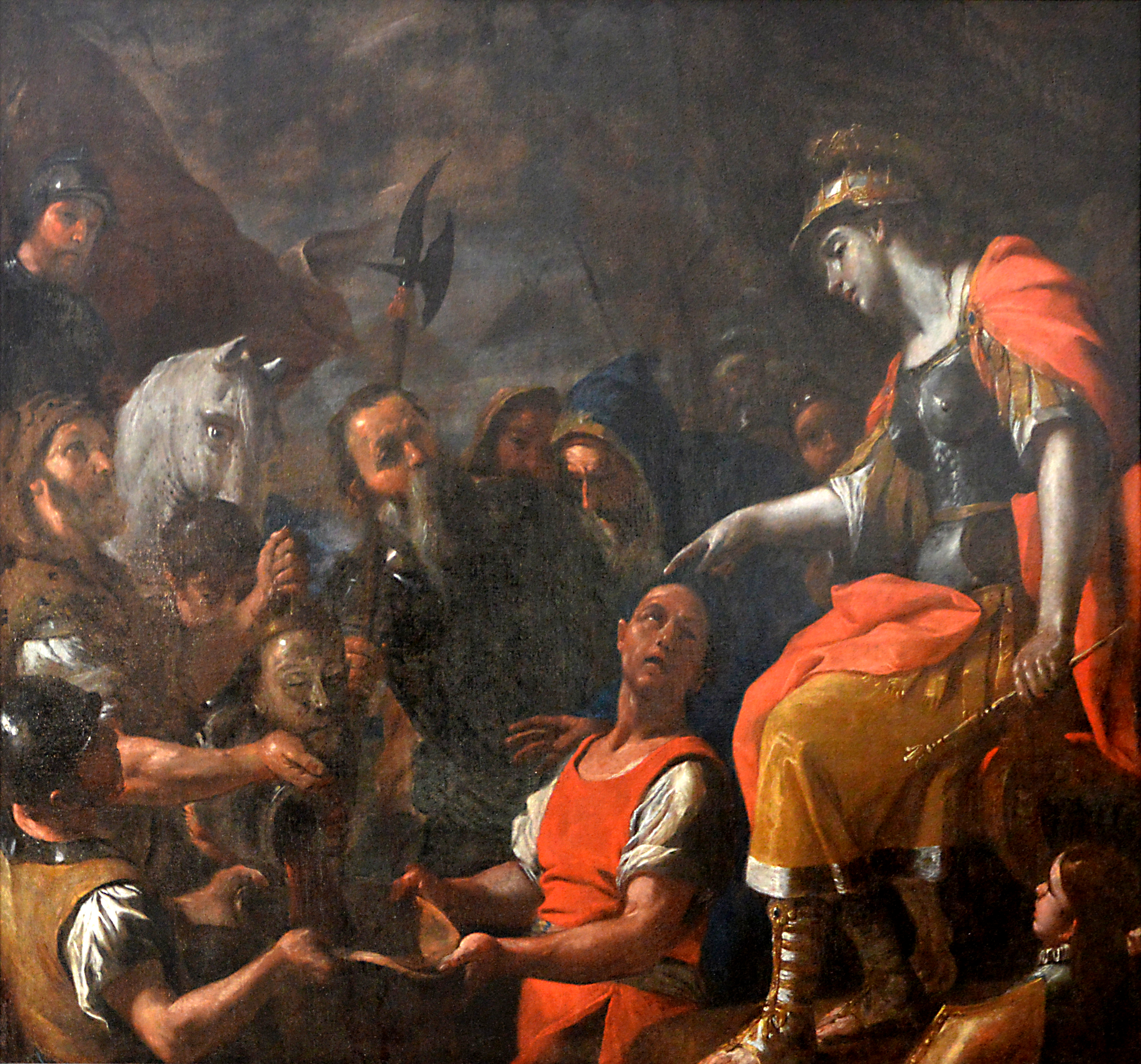
Queen Tomyris of the Massagetae receiving the head of Cyrus

Herodotus also recounts that Cyrus saw in his sleep the oldest son of Hystaspes (Darius I) with wings upon his shoulders, shadowing with the one wing Asia, and with the other wing Europe. Archaeologist Sir Max Mallowan explains this statement by Herodotus and its connection with the four winged bas-relief figure of Cyrus the Great in the following way:

Herodotus therefore, as I surmise, may have known of the close connection between this type of winged figure and the image of Iranian majesty, which he associated with a dream prognosticating the king's death before his last, fatal campaign across the Oxus.

Muhammad Dandamayev says that Persians may have taken Cyrus's body back from the Massagetae, unlike what Herodotus claimed.

According to the Chronicle of Michael the Syrian (AD 1166–1199) Cyrus was killed by his wife Tomyris, queen of the Massagetae (Maksata), in the 60th year of Jewish captivity.

An alternative account from Xenophon's Cyropaedia contradicts the others, claiming that Cyrus died peacefully at his capital. The final version of Cyrus's death comes from Berossus, who only reports that Cyrus met his death while warring against the Dahae archers northwest of the headwaters of the Syr Darya.

=== Resting place ===
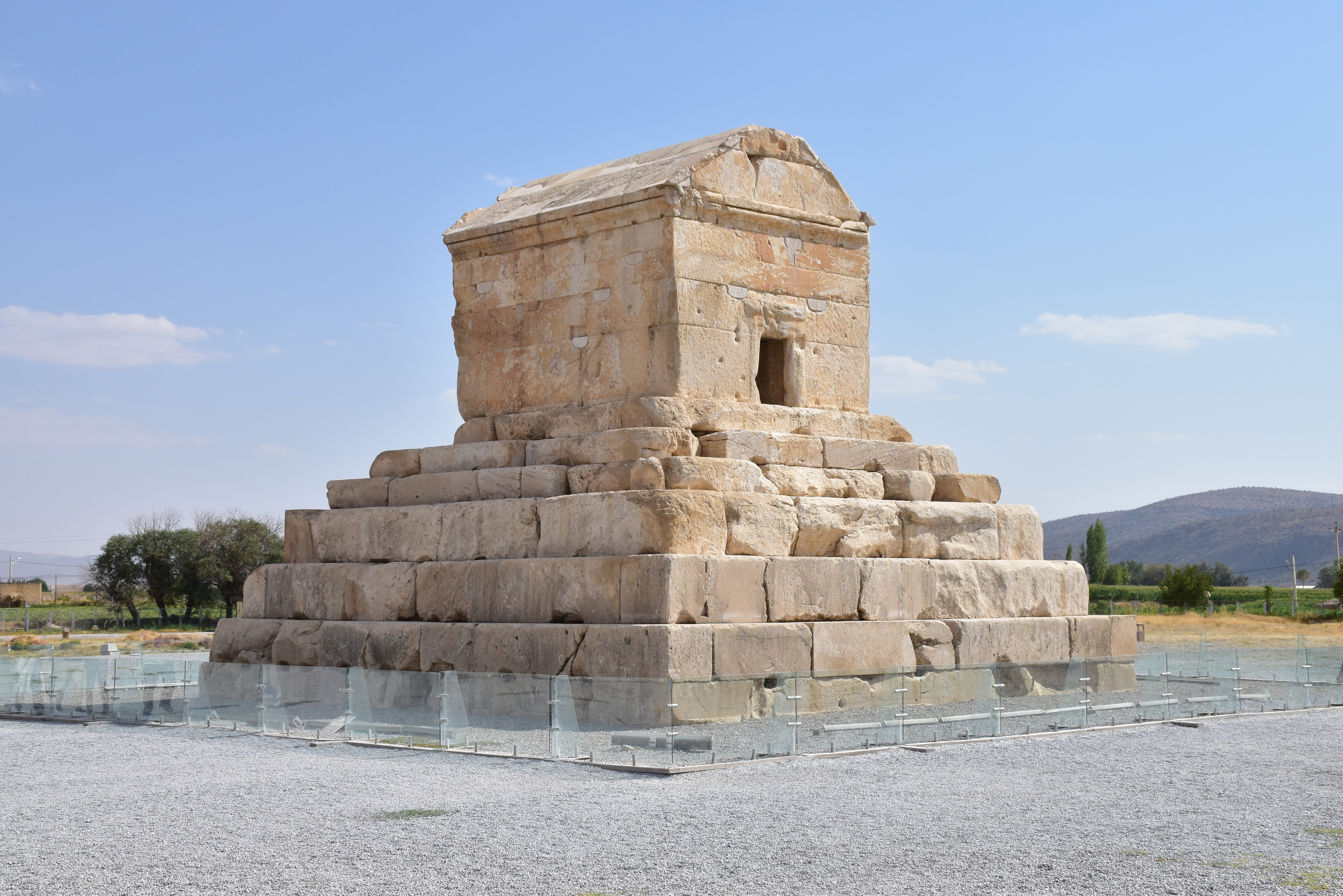
Tomb of Cyrus in Pasargadae, Iran, a UNESCO World Heritage Site (2015)

Cyrus the Great's remains may have been interred in his capital city of Pasargadae, where today a limestone tomb (built around 540–530 BC) still exists, which many believe to be his. Strabo and Arrian give nearly identical descriptions of the tomb, based on the eyewitness report of Aristobulus of Cassandreia, who at the request of Alexander the Great visited the tomb twice. Though the city itself is now in ruins, the burial place of Cyrus the Great has remained largely intact, and the tomb has been partially restored to counter its natural deterioration over the centuries. According to Plutarch, his epitaph read:

O man, whoever you are and wherever you come from, for I know you will come, I am Cyrus who won the Persians their empire. Do not therefore begrudge me this bit of earth that covers my bones.

Cuneiform evidence from Babylon proves that Cyrus died around December 530 BC, and that his son Cambyses II had become king. Cambyses continued his father's policy of expansion, and captured Egypt for the Empire, but soon died after only seven years of rule. He was succeeded either by Cyrus's other son Bardiya or an impostor posing as Bardiya, who became the sole ruler of Persia for seven months, until he was killed by Darius the Great.

The translated ancient Roman and Greek accounts give a vivid description of the tomb both geometrically and aesthetically; the tomb's geometric shape has changed little over the years, still maintaining a large stone of quadrangular form at the base, followed by a pyramidal succession of smaller rectangular stones, until after a few slabs, the structure is curtailed by an edifice, with an arched roof composed of a pyramidal shaped stone, and a small opening or window on the side, where the slenderest man could barely squeeze through.

Within this edifice was a golden coffin, resting on a table with golden supports, inside of which the body of Cyrus the Great was interred. Upon his resting place, was a covering of tapestry and drapes made from the best available Babylonian materials, utilizing fine Median worksmanship; below his bed was a fine red carpet, covering the narrow rectangular area of his tomb. Translated Greek accounts describe the tomb as having been placed in the fertile Pasargadae gardens, surrounded by trees and ornamental shrubs, with a group of Achaemenian protectors called the "Magi", stationed nearby to protect the edifice from theft or damage.

Years later, in the chaos created by Alexander the Great's invasion of Persia and after the defeat of Darius III, Cyrus the Great's tomb was broken into and most of its luxuries were looted. When Alexander reached the tomb, he was horrified by the manner in which the tomb was treated, and questioned the Magi and put them to court. On some accounts, Alexander's decision to put the Magi on trial was more about his attempt to undermine their influence and his show of power in his newly conquered empire, than a concern for Cyrus's tomb. However, Alexander admired Cyrus, from an early age reading Xenophon's Cyropaedia, which described Cyrus's heroism in battle and governance as a king and legislator. In any case, Alexander ordered Aristobulus to improve the tomb's condition and restore its interior. Despite his admiration for Cyrus the Great, and his attempts at renovation of his tomb, Alexander had, six years previously (330 BC), sacked Persepolis, the opulent city that Cyrus may have chosen the site for, and either ordered its burning as an act of pro-Greek propaganda or set it on fire during drunken revels.

The edifice has survived the test of time, through invasions, internal divisions, successive empires, regime changes, and revolutions. The last prominent Persian figure to bring attention to the tomb was Mohammad Reza Pahlavi (Shah of Iran) the last official monarch of Persia, during his celebrations of 2,500 years of monarchy. Just as Alexander the Great before him, the Shah of Iran wanted to appeal to Cyrus's legacy to legitimize his own rule by extension. The United Nations recognizes the tomb of Cyrus the Great and Pasargadae as a UNESCO World Heritage site.

== Legacy ==
=== Influence on Eastern and Western civilizations ===
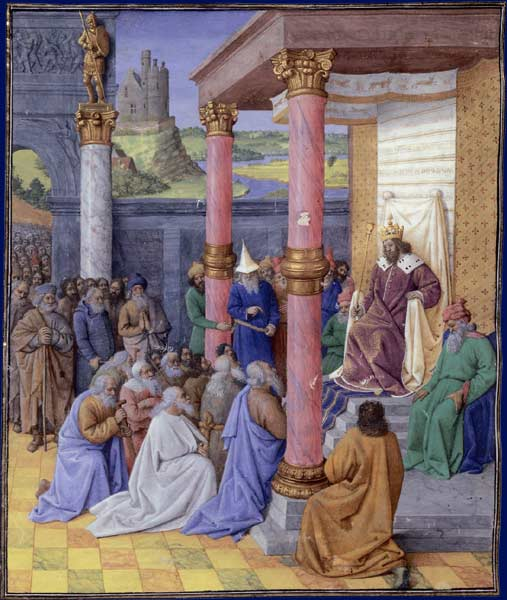
Cyrus the Great is said in the Bible to have liberated the Jews from the Babylonian captivity to resettle and rebuild Jerusalem, earning him an honored place in Judaism.

British historian Charles Freeman suggests that "In scope and extent his achievements [Cyrus] ranked far above that of the Macedonian king, Alexander, who was to demolish the [Achaemenid] empire in the 320s but fail to provide any stable alternative." Cyrus has been a personal hero to many people, including Thomas Jefferson, Mohammad Reza Pahlavi, and David Ben-Gurion.

The achievements of Cyrus the Great throughout antiquity are reflected in the way he is remembered today. His own nation, the Iranians, have regarded him as "The Father", the very title that had been used during the time of Cyrus himself, by the many nations that he conquered, as according to Xenophon: Cyrus's standard, described as a golden eagle mounted upon a "lofty shaft", remained the official banner of the Achaemenids.

And those who were subject to him, he treated with esteem and regard, as if they were his own children, while his subjects themselves respected Cyrus as their "Father" ... What other man but 'Cyrus', after having overturned an empire, ever died with the title of "The Father" from the people whom he had brought under his power? For it is plain fact that this is a name for one that bestows, rather than for one that takes away!

The historian Plutarch (c. 46 – c. 119 AD) tells that "the Persians, because Cyrus was hook-nosed, even to this day love hook-nosed men and consider them the most handsome".

The Babylonians regarded him as "The Liberator", as they were offended by their previous ruler, Nabonidus, for committing sacrilege. The rise of Persia under Cyrus's rule had a profound impact on the course of world history, including in forms of Iranian philosophy, literature and religion. Many of the Iranian dynasties following the Achaemenid Empire and their kings saw themselves as the heirs to Cyrus the Great and have claimed to continue the line begun by Cyrus. However, there are different opinions among scholars whether this is also the case for the Sassanid dynasty.

Alexander the Great was himself infatuated with and admired Cyrus the Great, from an early age reading Xenophon's Cyropaedia, which described Cyrus's heroism in battle and governance and his abilities as a king and a legislator. During his visit to Pasargadae he ordered Aristobulus to decorate the interior of the sepulchral chamber of Cyrus's tomb.

Cyrus's legacy has been felt even as far away as Iceland and colonial America. Many of the thinkers and rulers of classical antiquity as well as the Renaissance and Enlightenment era, and the forefathers of the United States of America sought inspiration from Cyrus the Great through works such as Cyropaedia. Thomas Jefferson, for example, owned two copies of Cyropaedia, one with parallel Greek and Latin translations on facing pages showing substantial Jefferson markings that signify the amount of influence the book has had on drafting the United States Declaration of Independence.

According to Professor Richard Nelson Frye, Cyrus—whose abilities as conqueror and administrator Frye says are attested by the longevity and vigor of the Achaemenid Empire—held an almost mythic role among the Persian people "similar to that of Romulus and Remus in Rome or Moses for the Israelites", with a story that "follows in many details the stories of hero and conquerors from elsewhere in the ancient world." Frye writes, "He became the epitome of the great qualities expected of a ruler in antiquity, and he assumed heroic features as a conqueror who was tolerant and magnanimous as well as brave and daring. His personality as seen by the Greeks influenced them and Alexander the Great, and, as the tradition was transmitted by the Romans, may be considered to influence our thinking even now."

His rule was studied and admired by many of the great leaders, such as Alexander the Great, Julius Caesar and Thomas Jefferson.

=== Administration and politics ===
==== Satrapy system ====
Cyrus founded the empire as a multi-state empire governed by four capital states; Pasargadae, Babylon, Susa and Ecbatana. He allowed a certain amount of regional autonomy in each state, in the form of a satrapy system. A satrapy was an administrative unit, usually organized on a geographical basis. A 'satrap' (governor) was the vassal king, who administered the region, a 'general' supervised military recruitment and ensured order, and a 'state secretary' kept the official records. The general and the state secretary reported directly to the satrap as well as the central government.

During his reign, Cyrus maintained control over a vast region of conquered kingdoms, achieved through retaining and expanding the satrapies. Further organization of newly conquered territories into provinces ruled by satraps was continued by Cyrus's successor, Darius the Great.

==== Military strategy ====
Cyrus's empire was based on tribute and conscripts from the many parts of his realm. Through his military savvy, Cyrus created an organized army including the Immortals unit, consisting of 10,000 highly trained soldiers.

Cyrus's conquests began a new era in the age of empire building, where a vast superstate, comprising many dozens of countries, races, religions, and languages, were ruled under a single administration headed by a central government. This system lasted for centuries, and was retained both by the invading Seleucid Empire during their control of Persia, and later Iranian dynasties including the Parthians and Sasanians.

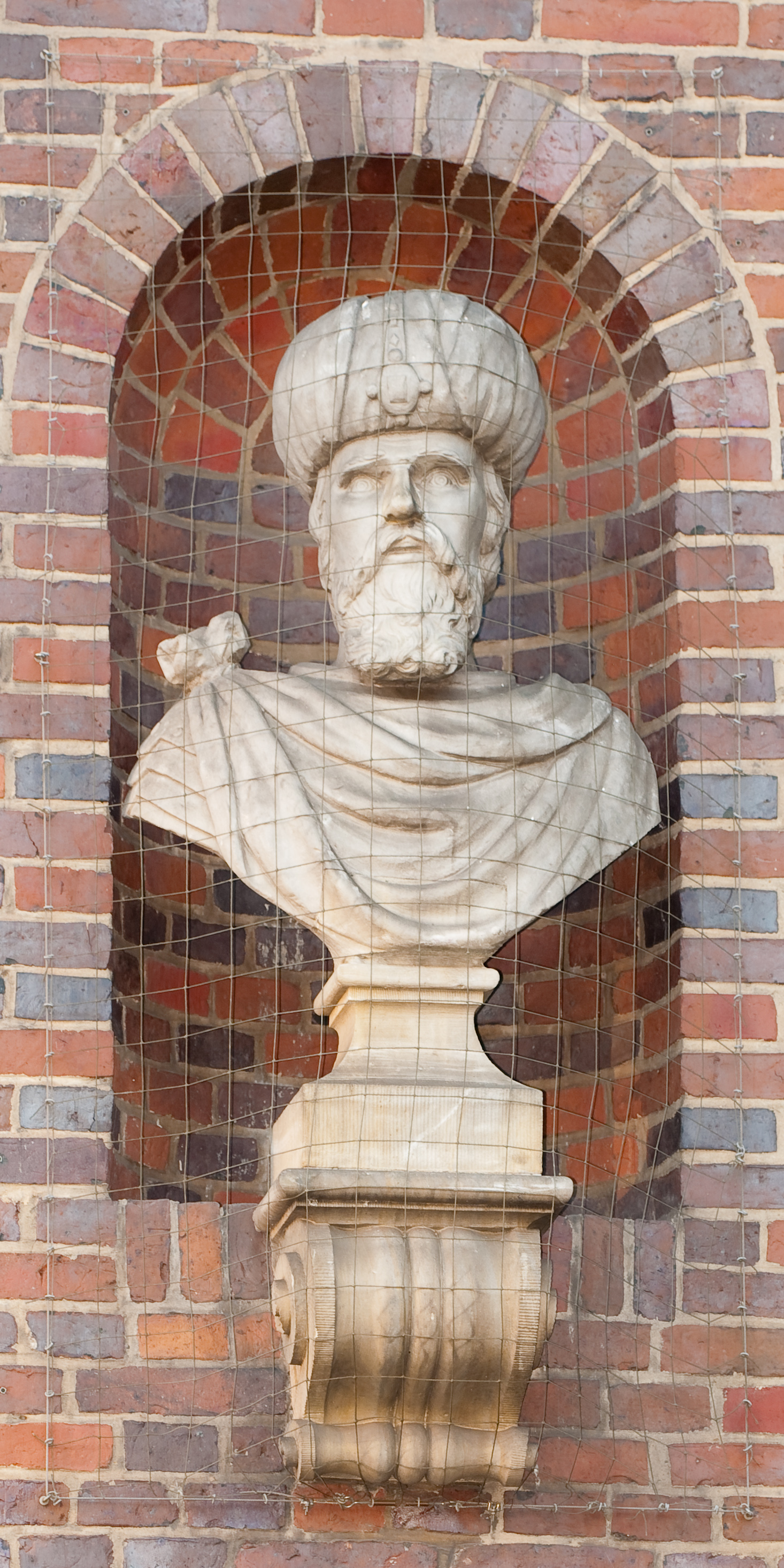
17th-century bust of Cyrus the Great in Hamburg, Germany

==== Infrastructure projects ====
Cyrus has been known for his innovations in building projects; he further developed the technologies that he found in the conquered cultures and applied them in building the palaces of Pasargadae. He was also famous for his love of gardens; the recent excavations in his capital city has revealed the existence of the Pasargadae Persian Garden and a network of irrigation canals. Pasargadae was a place for two magnificent palaces surrounded by a majestic royal park and vast formal gardens; among them was the four-quartered wall gardens of "Paradisia" with over 1000 meters of channels made out of carved limestone, designed to fill small basins at every 16 meters and water various types of wild and domestic flora. The design and concept of Paradisia were exceptional and have been used as a model for many ancient and modern parks, ever since.

He also formed an innovative postal system throughout the empire, based on several relay stations called Chapar Khaneh.

In 1658, while the Protectorate of Cromwell ruled Britain, the English physician and philosopher Sir Thomas Browne penned a discourse entitled The Garden of Cyrus, in which Cyrus is depicted as an archetypal wise ruler. However, despite being featured in the title, Cyrus was not a main focus of Browne's work.

"Cyrus the elder, brought up in Woods and Mountains, when time and power enabled, pursued the dictate of his education, and brought the treasures of the field into rule and circum-scription. So nobly beautifying the hanging Gardens of Babylon, that he was also thought to be the author thereof."

==== Currency denomination ====
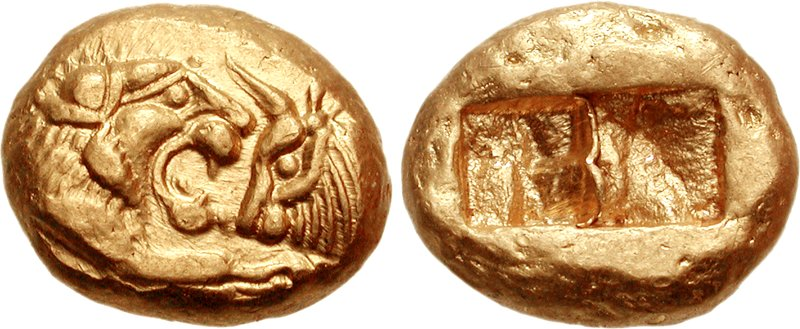
Achaemenid version of the Croeseid, minted in Lydia, under the rule of Cyrus the Great (Old Persian: 𐎤𐎢𐎽𐎢𐏁 Kūruš) to Darius I (Old Persian: 𐎭𐎠𐎼𐎹𐎺𐎢𐏁 Dārayavaʰuš), circa 545–520 BC. It only weighs 8.06 grams, compared to the standard 10.7 grams of the original Croeseid, which was the first gold coin in world history, minted by the Lydian king Croesus.

The use of the name Kuruş as a currency denomination for coinage goes back to the 6th century BC, dating to the time of the Croeseid, the world's first gold coin, originally minted by King Croesus of Lydia. The Croeseid was later continued to be minted and spread in a wide geographical area by Cyrus the Great (Old Persian: 𐎤𐎢𐎽𐎢𐏁 Kūruš), the founder of the Achaemenid Empire, who defeated King Croesus and conquered Lydia with the Battle of Thymbra in 547 BC. Cyrus (Kūruš) made the Croeseid the standard gold coin of his vast empire, using the same lion and bull design, but with a reduced weight (8.06 grams, instead of the standard 10.7 grams of the original version issued by King Croesus) due to the need for larger amounts of these coins, for a much larger population.

=== Human rights and multiculturalism ===
==== Cyrus Cylinder ====
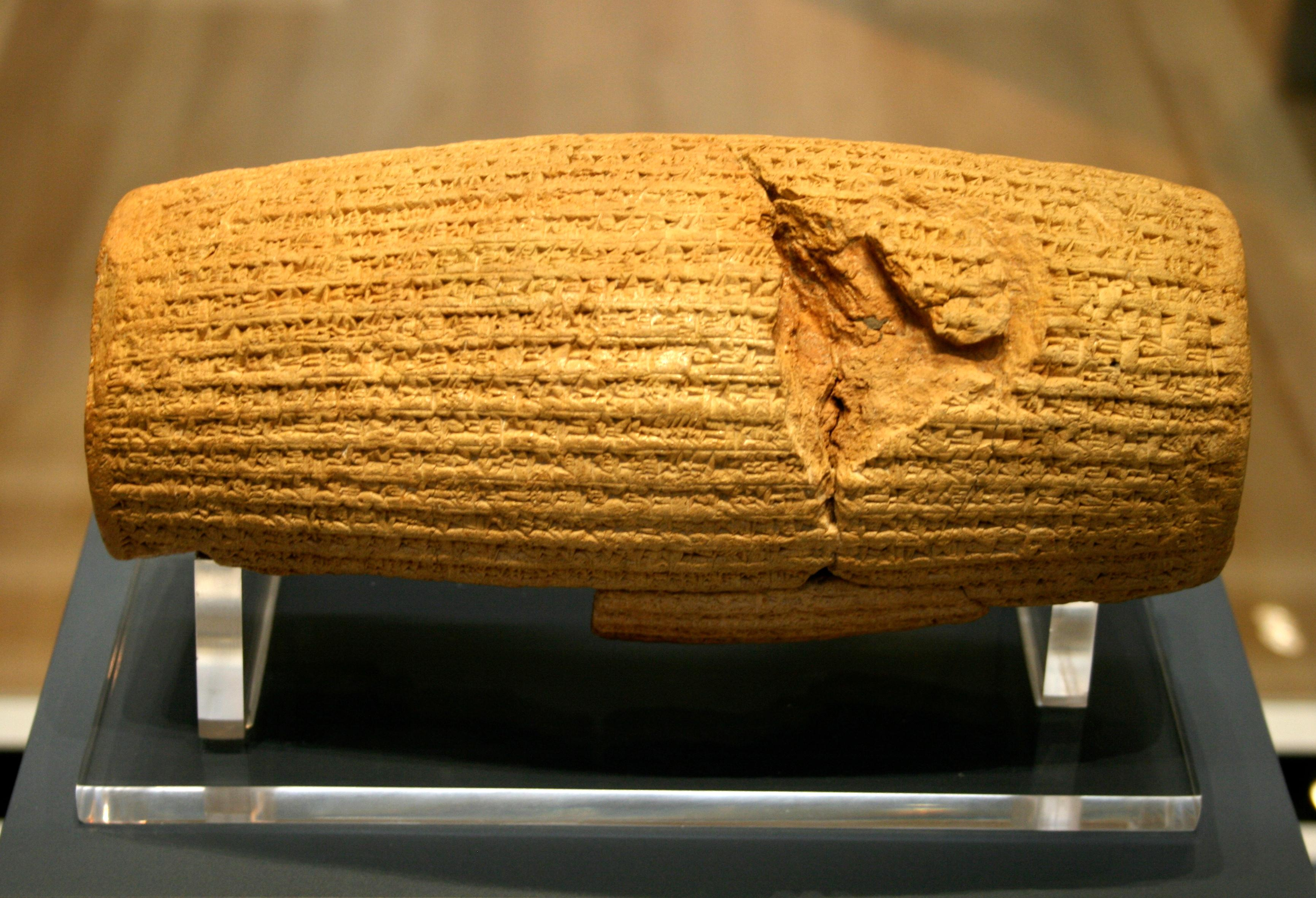
The Cyrus Cylinder at the British Museum, 2010

One of the few surviving sources of information that can be dated directly to Cyrus's time is the Cyrus Cylinder (Persian: استوانه کوروش), a document in the form of a clay cylinder inscribed in Akkadian cuneiform. It had been placed in the foundations of the Esagila (the temple of Marduk in Babylon) as a foundation deposit following the Persian conquest in 539 BC. It was discovered in 1879 and is kept today in the British Museum in London.

The text of the cylinder denounces the deposed Babylonian king Nabonidus as impious and portrays Cyrus as pleasing to the chief god Marduk. It describes how Cyrus had improved the lives of the citizens of Babylonia, repatriated displaced peoples and restored temples and cult sanctuaries. Although not mentioned specifically in the text, the repatriation of the Jews from their "Babylonian captivity" has been interpreted as part of this general policy.

In the 1970s, the Shah of Iran adopted the Cyrus cylinder as a political symbol, using it "as a central image in his celebration of 2500 years of Iranian monarchy", and asserting that it was "the first human rights charter in history". This view has been disputed by some as "rather anachronistic" and tendentious, as the modern concept of human rights would have been quite alien to Cyrus's contemporaries and is not mentioned by the cylinder. The cylinder has, nonetheless, become seen as part of Iran's cultural identity.

The United Nations has declared the relic to be an "ancient declaration of human rights" since 1971, approved by then Secretary General Sithu U Thant, after he "was given a replica by the sister of the Shah of Iran". The British Museum describes the cylinder as "an instrument of ancient Mesopotamian propaganda" that "reflects a long tradition in Mesopotamia where, from as early as the third millennium BC, kings began their reigns with declarations of reforms." The cylinder emphasizes Cyrus's continuity with previous Babylonian rulers, asserting his virtue as a traditional Babylonian king while denigrating his predecessor.

Neil MacGregor, director of the British Museum, has stated that the cylinder was "the first attempt we know about running a society, a state with different nationalities and faiths – a new kind of statecraft." He explained that "It has even been described as the first declaration of human rights, and while this was never the intention of the document – the modern concept of human rights scarcely existed in the ancient world – it has come to embody the hopes and aspirations of many."

=== Religion and philosophy ===
==== Zoroastrian presence in Achaemenid state affairs ====
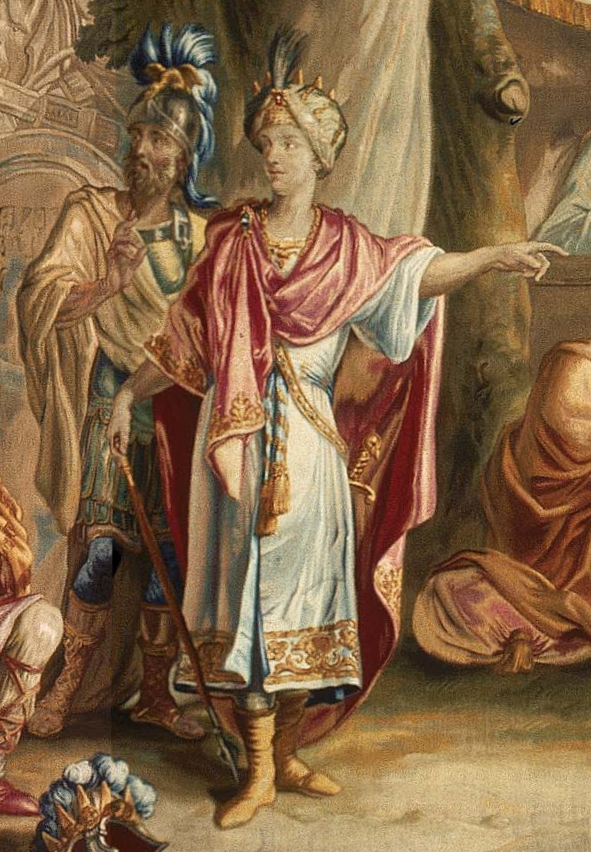
Cyrus the Great (center), with his general Harpagus behind him, as he receives the submission of the Median king Astyages (18th-century tapestry)

French Iranologist Pierre Briant wrote that, given the poor information we have, "it seems quite reckless to try to reconstruct what the religion of Cyrus might have been." It is also debated whether he was a Zoroastrian or whether Zoroastrianism only becomes involved as the Achaemenid state religion after his lifetime. The evidence in favour of it comes from some of the names of members of Cyrus's family, and similarities between the description of Yahweh in Isaiah 40–48 (which was after Isaiah came into contact with a Persian propagandist under Cyrus's administration who was Zoroastrian) and that of Ahura Mazda in the Gathas. Against the thesis is how Cyrus permitted total freedom of religion and provided funding for the establishment of their temples and other holy sites, as well as a possible late-date for the activity of the Iranian prophet Zoroaster, who founded Zoroastrianism.

==== Tolerance and freedom of religion ====
The policies of Cyrus with respect to treatment of minority religions are documented in many historical accounts, particularly in Babylonian and Jewish sources. Cyrus had a general policy of religious tolerance throughout his vast empire. Whether this was a new policy or the continuation of policies followed by the Babylonians and Assyrians (as American historian Lester Grabbe maintains) is disputed. He brought peace to the Babylonians and is said to have kept his army away from the temples and restored the statues of the Babylonian gods to their sanctuaries.

==== Personal faith and practices of Cyrus ====
Information about religion and ritual during the reign of Cyrus is also available from the Cyropaedia of Xenophon, the Histories of Herodotus, and inscriptions, though these were written in later periods and so must be used carefully.

The Cyrus Cylinder was composed in the name of Cyrus with him as the first-person speaker. The Cylinder is highly religious and is framed around the interventions of the Babylonian national god Marduk. It is Marduk who is praised in the outset of the text and whose direct intervention is thought to be responsible for what happened in recent history, and it is Marduk who summons Cyrus for the purpose of righting the wrongs of his predecessor Nabonidus. Furthermore, Cyrus offers respect not only to the cult of Marduk, but also to local cults. One inscription from Uruk states "(Cyrus) loves Esangil and Ezida" while another from Ur mentions that he "returned the gods to their shrines." Another from Babylon or Sippar says that unlike Nabonidus, Cyrus provided proper and even increased the sacrifices for the gods. Additional reliable information may come from the funerary customs around the tomb of Cyrus, which indicates a privileged cult honouring the Iranian god Mithra. Some have also identified the figure depicted in the bas-relief from Pasargadae as Mithra, further indicating the reverence of Cyrus for this deity. Additional evidence further indicates the connection between Cyrus and Mithra.

==== Liberation of the Jewish people ====
The treatment of the Jewish people by Cyrus during their exile in Babylon after the Babylonian king Nebuchadnezzar II destroyed the Kingdom of Judah is recorded in the Hebrew Bible. Cyrus is represented positively and as an agent of Yahweh, even though he is said to "not know" Yahweh (Isaiah 45:4–5).

The Ketuvim ends in Second Chronicles with the decree of Cyrus, which returned the exiles to the Land of Israel from Babylon along with a commission to rebuild the Temple in Jerusalem in light of Solomon's Temple having been destroyed by Babylonian armies.

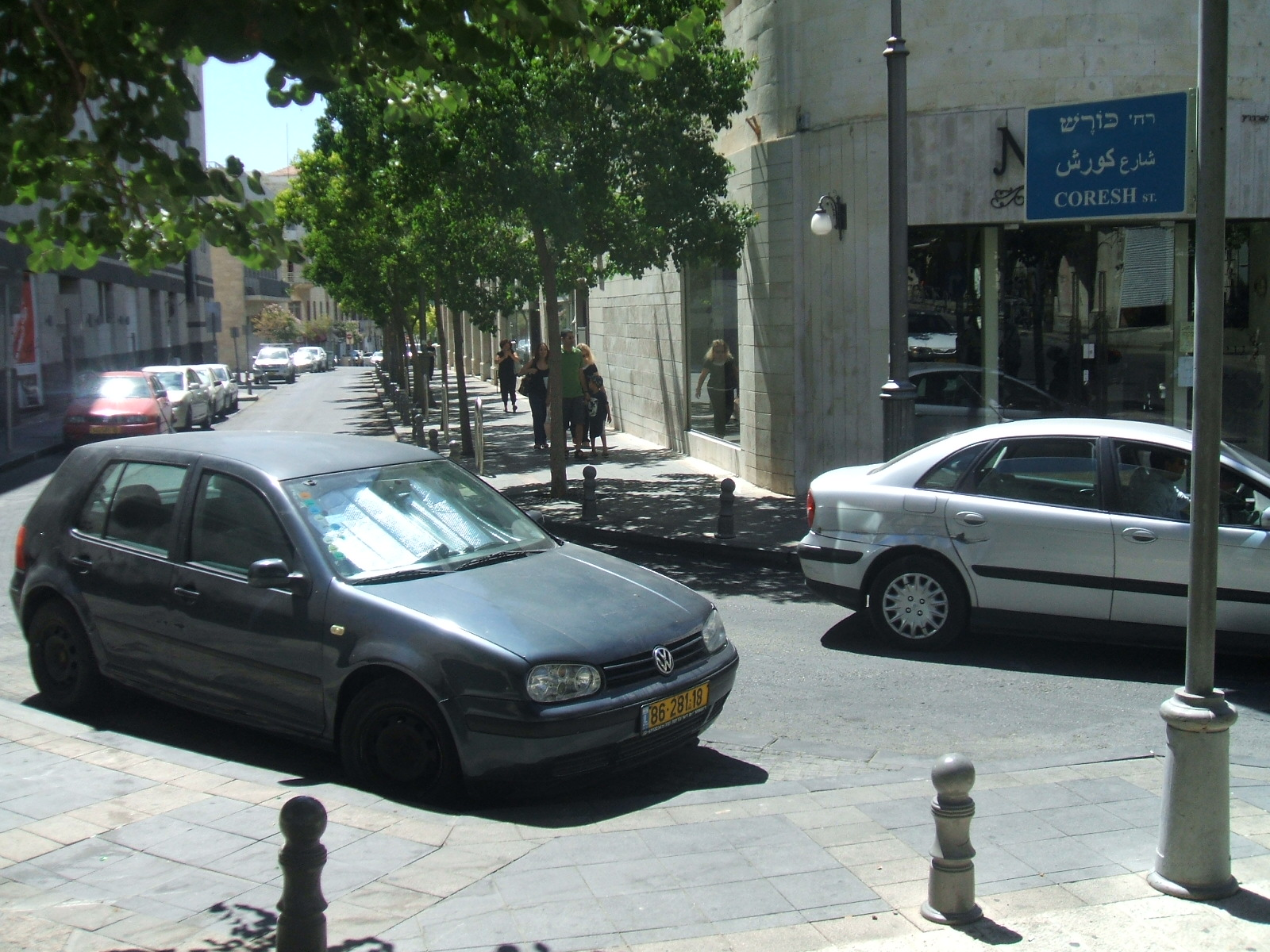
Cyrus Street in West Jerusalem, Israel, 2009

The Israelites honored him as a dignified and righteous king. In one Biblical passage, Isaiah refers to him as Messiah, making him the only gentile to be so referred. Elsewhere in Isaiah, God is described as saying, "I will raise up Cyrus in my righteousness: I will make all his ways straight. He will rebuild my city and set my exiles free, but not for a price or reward, says God Almighty." These particular passages (often referred to as Deutero-Isaiah) are believed by most modern critical scholars to have been added by another author toward the end of the Babylonian exile (c. 536 BC).

Josephus, the first-century Jewish historian, relates the traditional view of the Jews regarding the prediction of Cyrus in Isaiah in his Antiquities of the Jews, book 11, chapter 1:

In the first year of the reign of Cyrus, which was the seventieth from the day that our people were removed out of their own land into Babylon, God commiserated the captivity and calamity of these poor people, according as he had foretold to them by Jeremiah the prophet, before the destruction of the city, that after they had served Nebuchadnezzar and his posterity, and after they had undergone that servitude seventy years, he would restore them again to the land of their fathers, and they should build their temple, and enjoy their ancient prosperity. And these things God did afford them; for he stirred up the mind of Cyrus, and made him write this throughout all Asia: "Thus saith Cyrus the king: Since God Almighty hath appointed me to be king of the habitable earth, I believe that he is that God which the nation of the Israelites worship; for indeed he foretold my name by the prophets, and that I should build him a house at Jerusalem, in the country of Judea." This was known to Cyrus by his reading the book which Isaiah left behind him of his prophecies; for this prophet said that God had spoken thus to him in a secret vision: "My will is, that Cyrus, whom I have appointed to be king over many and great nations, send back my people to their own land, and build my temple." This was foretold by Isaiah one hundred and forty years before the temple was demolished. Accordingly, when Cyrus read this, and admired the Divine power, an earnest desire and ambition seized upon him to fulfill what was so written; so he called for the most eminent Jews that were in Babylon, and said to them, that he gave them leave to go back to their own country, and to rebuild their city Jerusalem, and the temple of God, for that he would be their assistant, and that he would write to the rulers and governors that were in the neighborhood of their country of Judea, that they should contribute to them gold and silver for the building of the temple, and besides that, beasts for their sacrifices.

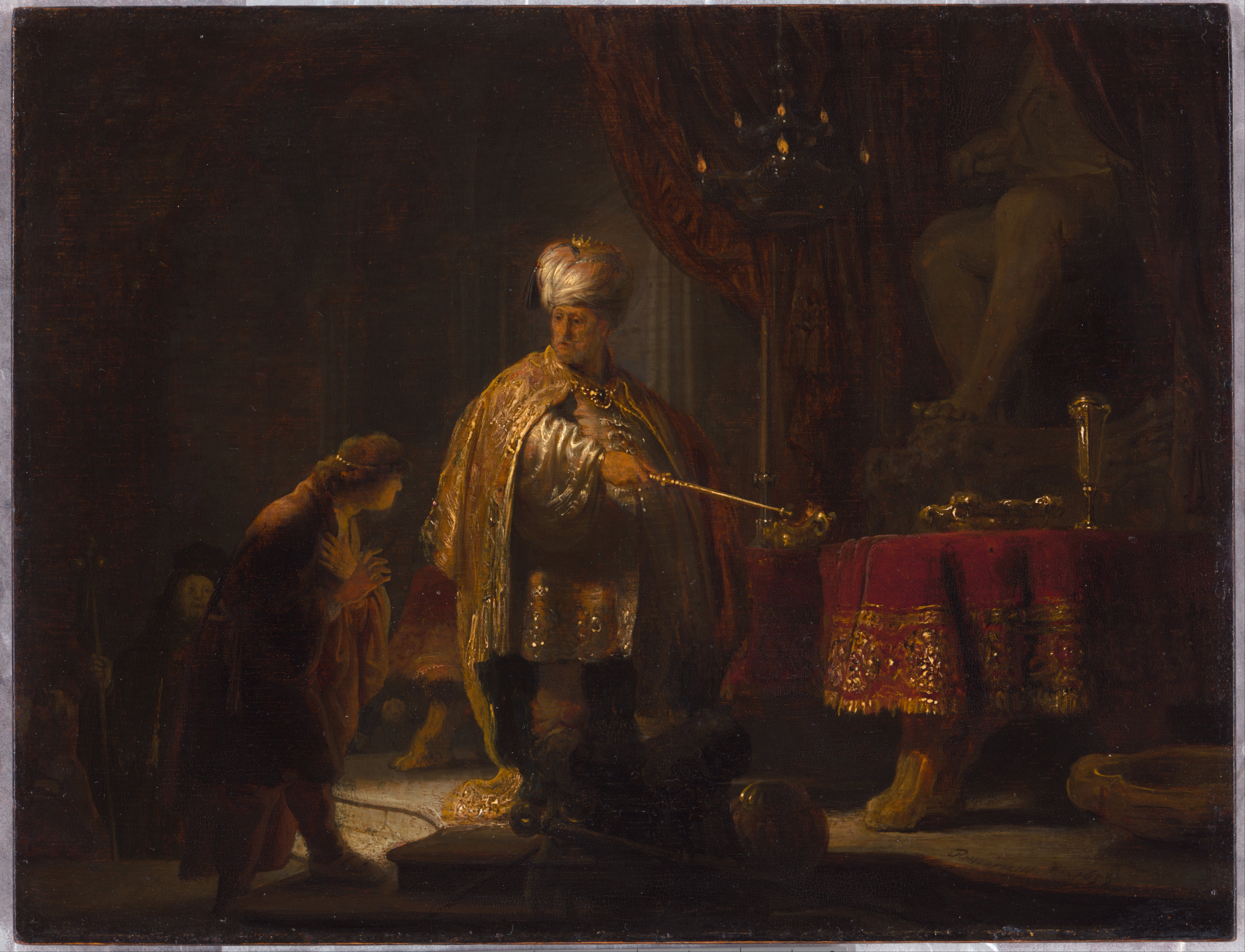
Painting of Daniel and Cyrus before the Idol Bel

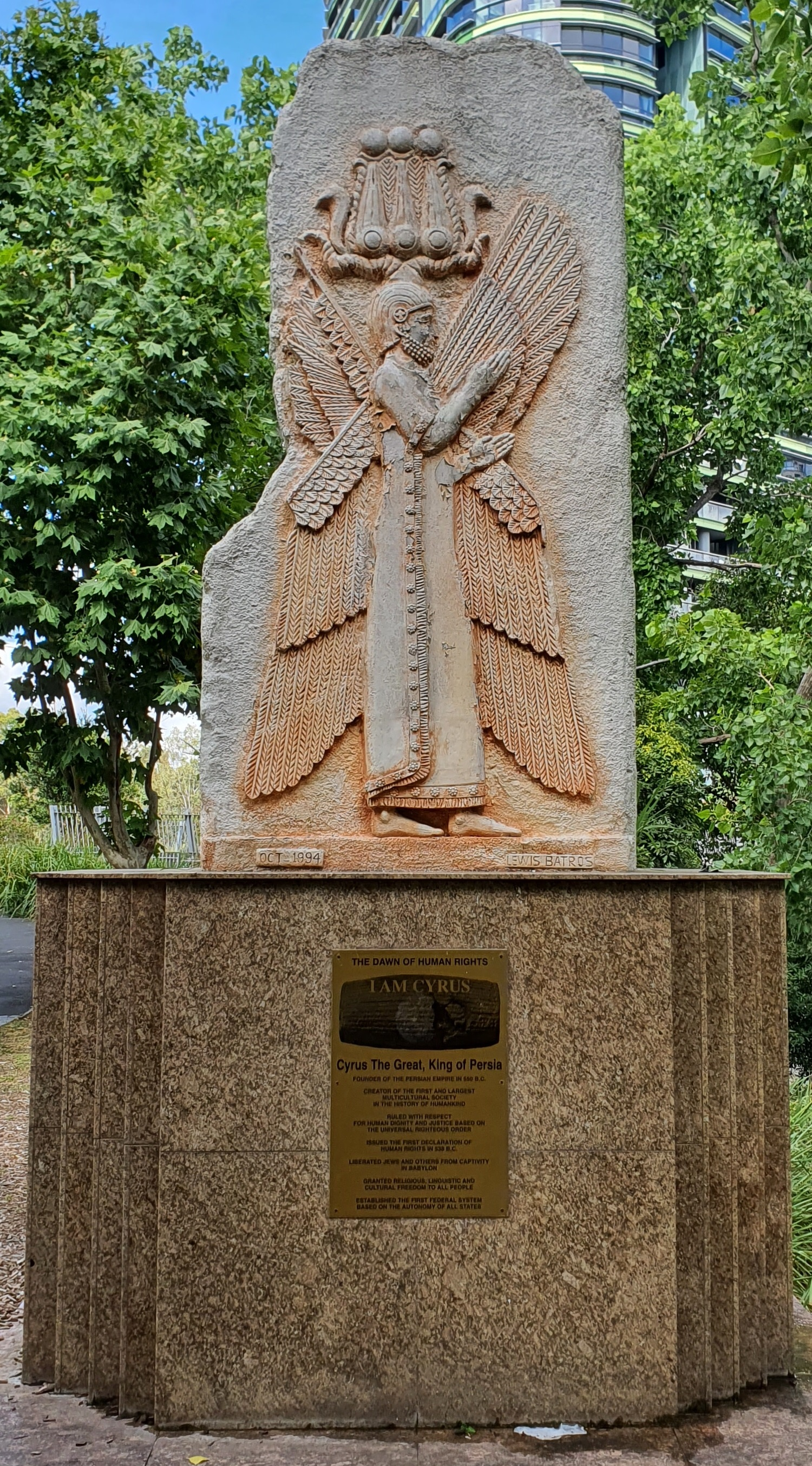
Statue of Cyrus the Great at Olympic Park in Sydney

There was Jewish criticism of Cyrus after he was lied to by the Cuthites, who wanted to halt the building of the Second Temple. They accused the Jews of conspiring to rebel, so Cyrus in turn stopped the construction, which would not be completed until 515 BC, during the reign of Darius I. According to the Bible, it was King Artaxerxes who was convinced to stop the construction of the temple in Jerusalem. The historical nature of this decree has been challenged. Professor Lester L Grabbe argues that there was no decree but that there was a policy that allowed exiles to return to their homelands and rebuild their temples. He also argues that the archaeology suggests that the return was a "trickle", taking place over perhaps decades, resulting in a maximum population of perhaps 30,000. Philip R. Davies called the authenticity of the decree "dubious", citing Grabbe and adding that arguing against "the authenticity of Ezra 1.1–4 is J. Briend, in a paper given at the Institut Catholique de Paris on 15 December 1993, who denies that it resembles the form of an official document but reflects rather biblical prophetic idiom."

Mary Joan Winn Leith believes that the decree in Ezra might be authentic and along with the Cylinder that Cyrus, like earlier rulers, was through these decrees trying to gain support from those who might be strategically important, particularly those close to Egypt which he wished to conquer. She also wrote that "appeals to Marduk in the cylinder and to Yahweh in the biblical decree demonstrate the Persian tendency to co-opt local religious and political traditions in the interest of imperial control."

==== Theorized allusion in Islamic scripture ====
In the 19th century, a number of prominent Indian Muslim scholars began theorizing that Cyrus the Great is the individual mentioned in the Quran by the name Dhu al-Qarnayn, who is described as travelling west and east (towards the "setting and rising places of the Sun") and erecting a large barrier to separate a troubled people from "Ya'juj and Ma'juj" in exchange for tribute, with this barrier destined to keep them sealed until their release signals the end of the world and the Day of Judgement. It was first promoted by Syed Ahmad Khan (1817–1898) and then by Maulana Azad (1888–1958), subsequently generating wider acceptance among some Muslim communities over the years.

This theory was proposed in 1855 by the German philologist Gustav Moritz Redslob, but it was largely dismissed in the Western world. Most Western scholars of religion have instead lent credence to more popular theories in traditional Islamic mythology that identify Dhu al-Qarnayn as either the Greek king Alexander the Great or a certain pre-Islamic Arabian king.

== See also ==
- List of people known as the Great
- List of biblical figures identified in extra-biblical sources
  - Kay Bahman
- Cyrus the Great Day
  - 2016 Cyrus the Great Revolt

== Bibliography ==
=== Ancient sources ===
- The Nabonidus Chronicle of the Babylonian Chronicles
- The Verse account of Nabonidus
- The Prayer of Nabonidus (one of the Dead Sea scrolls)
- The Cyrus Cylinder
- Herodotus (The Histories)
- Ctesias (Persica)
- The biblical books of Isaiah, Daniel, Ezra and Nehemiah
- Flavius Josephus (Antiquities of the Jews)
- Thucydides (History of the Peloponnesian War)
- Plato (Laws (dialogue))
- Xenophon (Cyropaedia)
- Quintus Curtius Rufus (Library of World History)
- Plutarch (Plutarch's Lives)
- Fragments of Nicolaus of Damascus
- Arrian (Anabasis Alexandri)
- Polyaenus (Stratagems in War)
- Justin (Epitome of the Philippic History of Pompeius Trogus) (in English)
- Polybius (The Histories (Polybius))
- Diodorus Siculus (Bibliotheca historica)
- Athenaeus (Deipnosophistae)
- Strabo (History)
- Quran (Dhul-Qarnayn, Al-Kahf)

=== Modern sources ===
- Boardman, John, ed. (1994). The Cambridge Ancient History IV: Persia, Greece, and the Western Mediterranean, C. 525–479 B.C. Cambridge: Cambridge University Press. ISBN 0-521-22804-2.
- Boyce, Mary (1988). "The religion of Cyrus the Great" (PDF). In Kuhrt, A.; Sancisi-Weerdenburg, H. (eds.). Proceedings of the London 1985 Achaemenid History Workshop. pp. 15–31.
- Briant, Pierre (2002). From Cyrus to Alexander: A History of the Persian Empire. Eisenbrauns. pp. 1–1196. ISBN 978-1-57506-120-7. Archived from the original on 14 May 2022.
- Cardascia, G (1988). "Babylon under Achaemenids". Encyclopaedia Iranica. Vol. 3. London: Routledge. ISBN 0-939214-78-4. Archived from the original on 17 November 2011.
- Church, Alfred J. (1881). Stories of the East from Herodotus. London: Seeley, Jackson & Halliday.
- Curzon, George Nathaniel (2018) [1892]. Persia and the Persian Question, Volume 2. Cambridge University Press. ISBN 978-1-108-08085-9.
- Dandamaev, M. A. (1989). A political history of the Achaemenid empire. Leiden: Brill. p. 373. ISBN 90-04-09172-6.
- Daryaee, Touraj (2013). "Religion of Cyrus the Great" (PDF). Cyrus the Great: An Ancient Iranian King. Afshar Publishing. pp. 25–42.
- Dandamayev, Muhammad A. (1993). "Cyrus iii. Cyrus II The Great". Encyclopaedia Iranica, Vol. IV, Fasc. 7. pp. 516–521. Archived from the original on 17 November 2018.
- Finkel, Irving (2013). The Cyrus Cylinder: The Great Persian Edict from Babylon. I.B. Tauris.
- Freeman, Charles (1999). The Greek Achievement: The Foundation of the Western World. New York: Viking. ISBN 0-7139-9224-7.
- Frye, Richard N. (1962). The Heritage of Persia. London: Weidenfeld and Nicolson. ISBN 1-56859-008-3
- Gershevitch, Ilya (1985). The Cambridge History of Iran: Vol. 2; The Median and Achaemenian periods. Cambridge: Cambridge University Press. ISBN 0-521-20091-1.
- Grayson (1975), Assyrian and Babylonian Chronicles
- Kuhrt, Amélie (1995). "13". The Ancient Near East: c. 3000–330 BC. Routledge. p. 647. ISBN 0-415-16763-9.
- Kuhrt, Amélie (2013). The Persian Empire: A Corpus of Sources from the Achaemenid Period. Routledge. ISBN 978-1-136-01694-3. Archived from the original on 10 June 2021.
- Llewellyn-Jones, Lloyd (2017). "The Achaemenid Empire". In Daryaee, Touraj (ed.). King of the Seven Climes: A History of the Ancient Iranian World (3000 BC – 651 CE). UCI Jordan Center for Persian Studies. pp. 1–236. ISBN 978-0-692-86440-1. Archived from the original on 14 June 2022.
- Moorey, P.R.S. (1991). The Biblical Lands, VI. New York: Peter Bedrick Books . ISBN 0-87226-247-2
- Olmstead, A. T. (1948). History of the Persian Empire [Achaemenid Period]. Chicago: University of Chicago Press. ISBN 0-226-62777-2
- Palou, Christine; Palou, Jean (1962). La Perse Antique. Paris: Presses Universitaires de France.
- Schmitt, Rüdiger (1983). "Achaemenid dynasty". Encyclopaedia Iranica. Vol. 3. London: Routledge. Archived from the original on 3 December 2015.
- Schmitt, Rüdiger (2010). CYRUS i. The Name. Routledge & Kegan Paul.
- Sekunda, N.V. (2010). "Changes in Achaemenid Royal Dress". In Curtis, John; Simpson, John (eds.). The World of Achaemenid Persia: History, Art and Society in Iran and the Ancient Near East. I.B. Tauris. pp. 255–272. ISBN 978-0-85771-801-3.
- Soudavar, Abolala (2012). "Astyages, Cyrus and Zoroaster: Solving a Historical Dilemma". Iran. 50 (1): 45–78. doi:10.1080/05786967.2012.11834712.
- Stoneman, Richard (2003). "Alexander the Great in Arabic Tradition". In Panayotakis, Stelios; Zimmerman, Maaike; Keulen, Wytse (eds.). The Ancient Novel and Beyond. Brill Academic Publishers NV. ISBN 978-90-04-12999-3.
- Stronach, David (2010). "Solomon at Pasargadae: Some New Perspectives". Bulletin of the Asia Institute. 24: 1–14. JSTOR 43896116.
- Tait, Wakefield (1846). The Presbyterian review and religious journal. Oxford University. Archived from the original on 10 June 2021.
- Toorawa, Shawkat M. (2011). "Islam". In Allen, Roger (ed.). Islam; A Short Guide for the Faithful. Eerdmans. p. 8. ISBN 978-0-8028-6600-4. Archived from the original on 15 October 2021.
- Waters, Matt (2004). "Cyrus and the Achaemenids". Iran. 42. Taylor & Francis, Ltd.: 91–102. doi:10.2307/4300665. JSTOR 4300665. (registration required)
- Waters, Matt (2014). Ancient Persia: A Concise History of the Achaemenid Empire, 550–330 BC. Cambridge University Press. pp. 1–272. ISBN 978-1-107-65272-9. Archived from the original on 15 October 2021.

Cyrus the Great Achaemenid dynasty Born: c. 600 BC Died: 530 BC
| New title Not previously established | King of Kings of Persian Empire ?–530 BC | Succeeded by Cambyses II |
| Preceded by Cambyses I | King of Persia; 559–530 BC | Succeeded by Cambyses II |
| Preceded by Astyages | King of Media; 550–530 BC | Succeeded by Cambyses II |
| Preceded by Croesus | King of Lydia; 547–530 BC | Succeeded by Cambyses II |
| Preceded by Nabonidus | King of Babylon; 539–530 BC | Succeeded by Cambyses II |
