= Winged genius relief (Pasargadae) =

Bas relief in Iran

The winged being relief
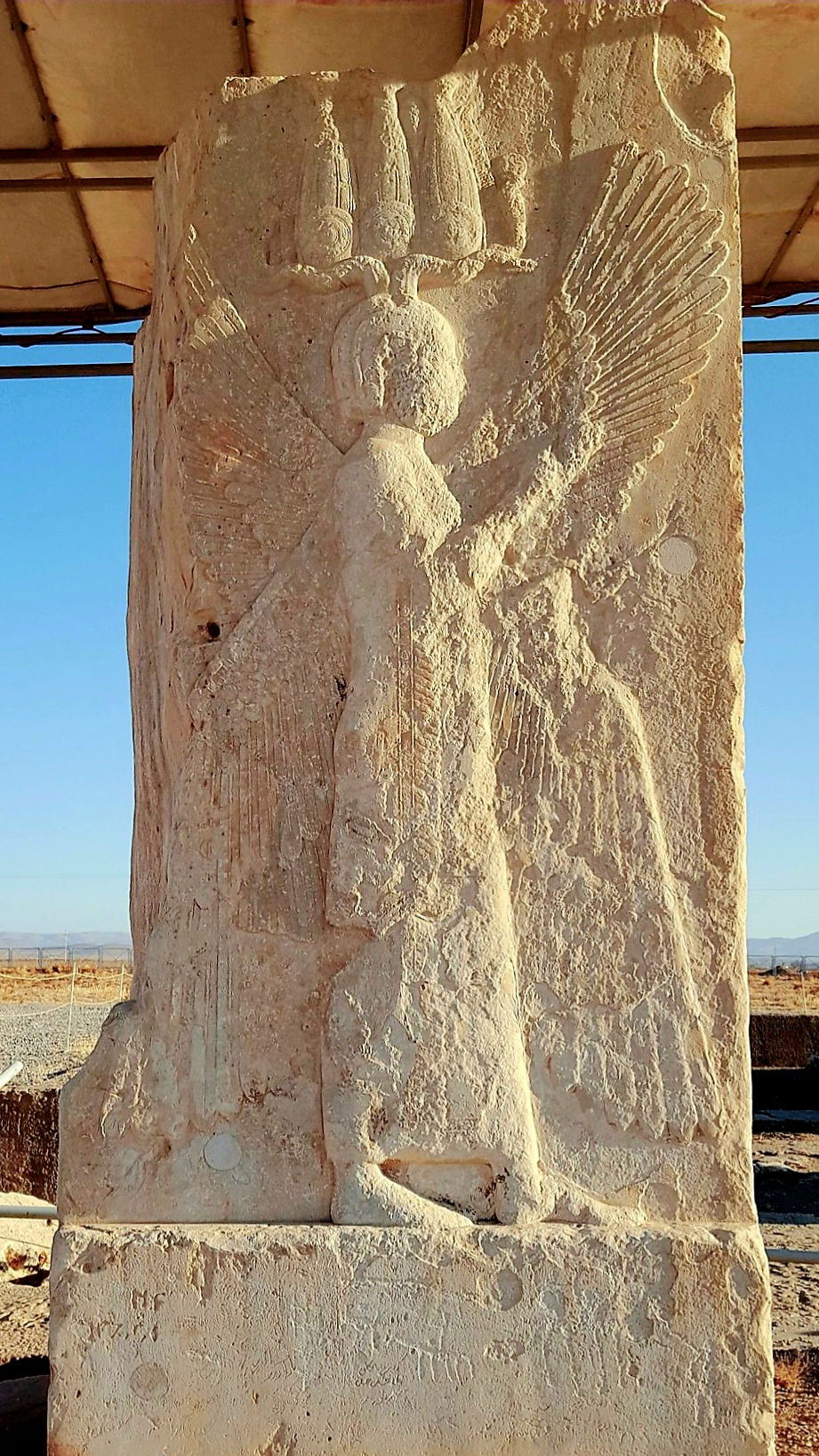
- Year: Achaemenid Era
- Medium: Bas-relief
- Dimensions: 2.9 m (110 in)

The winged genius relief (Persian: سنگ نگاره انسان بالدار) is a 2.90 meters tall Achaemenid bas relief in Pasargadae, Iran.

It is located at the north-eastern gate of the palace remains in Pasargadae and features a winged genie facing left towards the palace complex. At one point, the relief included a trilingual inscription reading "I, Cyrus, the king, an Achaemenid", leading many to believe the genie is a representation of Cyrus the Great of the Achaemenid Empire; this notion has been since discredited. The inscription was removed from the relief at some point during the 19th century.

== Description ==
The winged genie relief features a four-winged man standing 2.50 meters tall, which, when accounting for the Hemhem crown on his head, adds up to 2.90 meters tall in total. It is located in what used to be the north-eastern gate of the palace complex, and was once accompanied by winged bull statues akin to the Lamassu found in Persepolis. The Lamassu have since been destroyed with only stone fragments remaining, leaving the genie figure as the sole surviving structure of the gate. A trilingual inscription in Old Persian, Elamite and Akkadian once existed above the relief, reading "I, Cyrus, the king, an Achaemenid", but has, since the mid-19th century, been missing. The same inscription has been found in other places in the complex, without the accompanying genie, which attributes the construction of the palace to Cyrus the Great and discredits the notion that the genie itself represents Cyrus the great.

Winged genies are a motif in ancient Assyrian art and architecture, appearing frequently in palaces and royal places. With the incorporation of Assyrian lands into the Achaemenid empire, many of its motifs came to be used in Achaemenid art and architecture. There might have been a second winged genie at the other wall of the gate guarding the king or his statue.

The genie wears an Elamite robe with an Ionian rosette border, an Egyptian Hemhem crown and includes neo-Babylonian stylistic elements, all while being an Assyrian winged genie, seemingly to combine the cultural elements of newly conquered peoples and lands.
