= Amyntas =

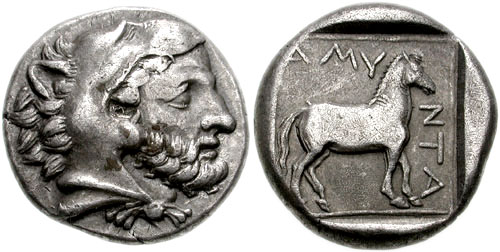
Coin of Amyntas III of Macedon. Greek inscription reads ΑΜΥΝΤΑ, lit. '[coin] of Amyntas'

Amyntas (Ancient Greek: Ἀμύντας) is a male given name, a variation of ἀμύντης (amyntes), derived from the Ancient Greek: ἀμύντωρ (amyntor) 'defender, helper' and ultimately from the verb ἀμύνω 'to ward off, to defend'. It was particularly widespread in ancient Macedon, and was given to several prominent ancient Macedonian and Hellenistic figures. It later became a stock name for lovelorn shepherds in 16th-century pastoral literature.

== Kings of Macedon ==
- Amyntas I of Macedon, king of Macedon (c. 540–498 BC)
- Amyntas II of Macedon, king of Macedon
- Amyntas III of Macedon, king of Macedon (393–369 BC)
- Amyntas IV of Macedon, king of Macedon (359 BC)

== Military figures ==
- Amyntas (son of Andromenes), general of Alexander the Great, died in 330 BC
- Amyntas (son of Antiochus), fugitive to Persians
- Amyntas (son of Arrhabaeus), hipparchos
- Amyntas (son of Alexander)
- Amyntas, father of taxiarch Philip
- Amyntas, father of Philip and first father-in-law of Berenice I of Egypt
- Amyntas (Antigonid general), died in Cappadocia 301 BC
- Amyntas of Rhodes, admiral against Demetrius Poliorcetes
- Amyntas of Pieria, 2nd Thessalian praetor 194 BC
- Amyntas of Mieza, somatophylax of Philip III Arrhidaeus
- Amyntas II (son of Bubares), Persian ruler of Alabanda

== Hellenistic kings ==
- Amyntas Nikator, Indo-Greek king who ruled in parts of the northern Indian subcontinent between 95 and 90 BC
- Amyntas of Galatia, tetrarch of the Trocmi and king of Galatia (37–25 BC)
- Amyntas, Tetrarch of the Tectosagii, king of Cilicia Trachae between 36 BC and 25 BC

== Writers ==
- Amyntas of Heraclea, mathematician; student of Plato
- Amyntas (bematist), wrote Stathmoi
- Amyntas the surgeon

== Athletes ==
- Amyntas of Aeolia in diaulos
- Amyntas of Ephesus, pankratiast
- Amyntas (son of Menophilos), Aiolian, winner of the horse race at the Greater Amphiareia, beginning of the first century

== Fictional shepherds ==
- Amyntas, the title shepherd in Torquato Tasso's play Aminta, translated into English by Leigh Hunt as Amyntas, a Tale of the Woods
- Amyntas, the title shepherd in Thomas Watson's Latin eclogue cycle Amyntas
- Amyntas, the title shepherd in Thomas Randolph's play Amyntas, or The Impossible Dowry
- Amyntas, a shepherd in love with Cloris in Samuel Daniel's play The Queene's Arcadia

== Places ==
- Tomb of Amyntas, ancient Lycian rock-hewn tomb at ancient Telmessos, in the district of Fethiye, Turkey.
