= Carians =

Ancient inhabitants of south-western Asia-Minor

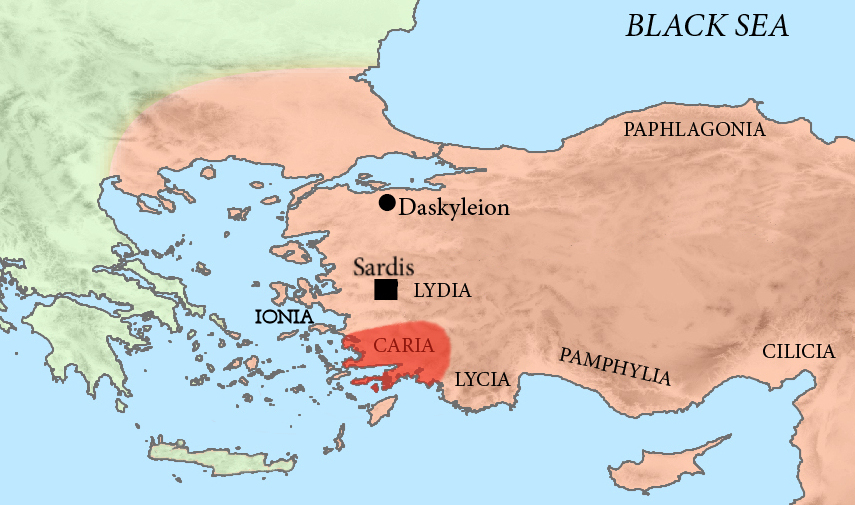
Location of Caria within the classical regions of Asia Minor

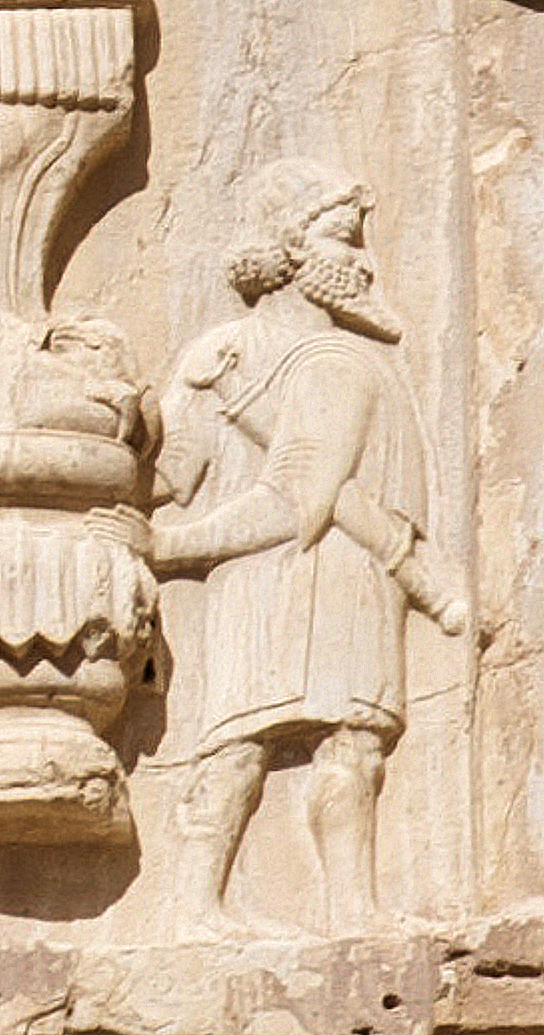
Carian soldier of the Achaemenid army c. 480 BC. Tomb of Xerxes I.

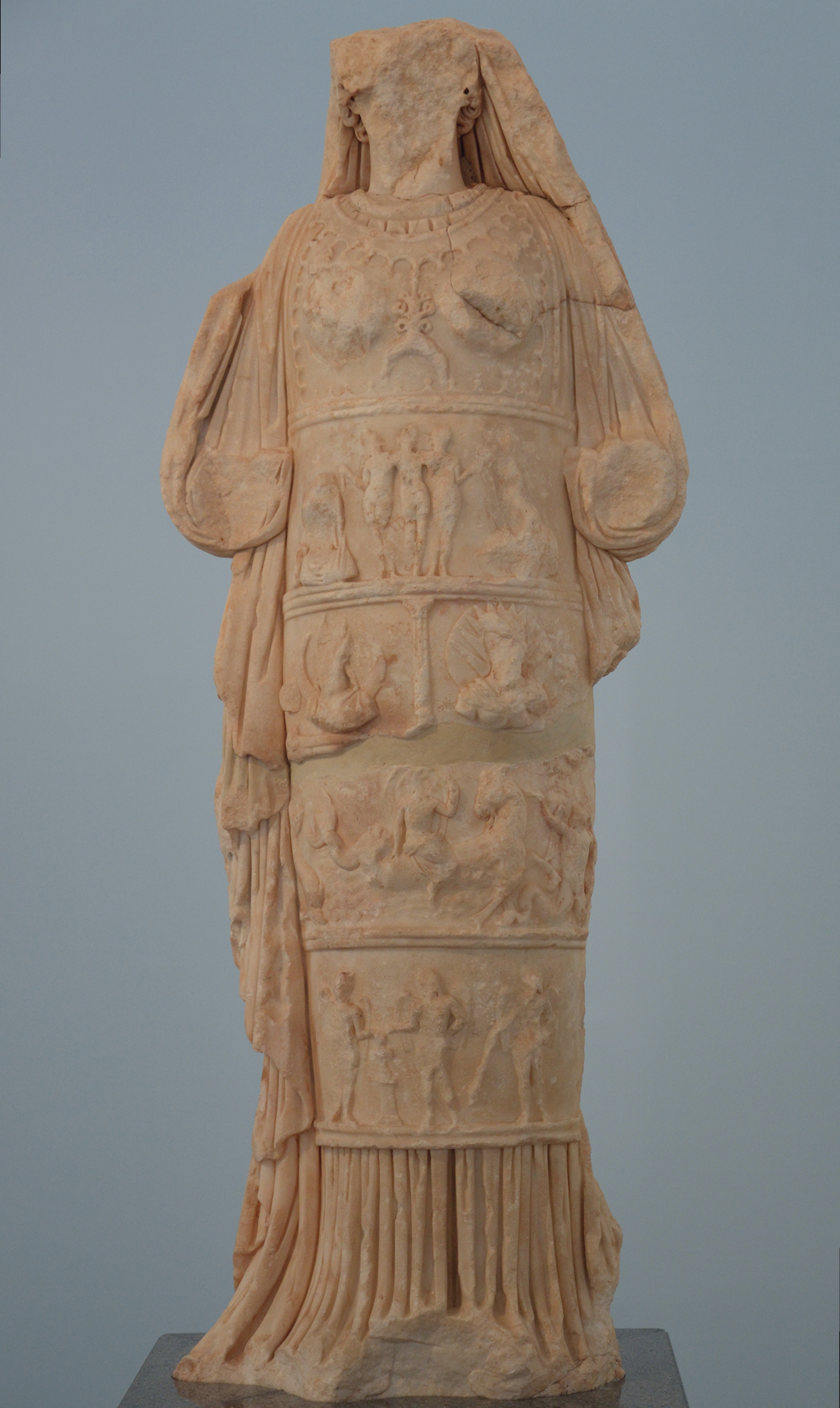
Ancient copy of the cult image of a local Hellenistic goddess as Aphrodite at Aphrodisias

The Carians (/ˈkɛəriənz/; Ancient Greek: Κᾶρες, Kares, plural of Κάρ, Kar) were the ancient inhabitants of Caria in southwest Anatolia, who spoke the Carian language.

== Historical accounts ==
=== Karkisa ===
It is not clear when the Carians enter into history. The definition is dependent on the corresponding Caria and the Carians to the "Karkiya" or "Karkisa" mentioned in the Hittite records. Bronze Age Karkisa are first mentioned as having aided the Assuwa League against the Hittite King Tudhaliya I. Later in 1323 BC, King Arnuwandas II was able to write to Karkiya for them to provide asylum for the deposed Manapa-Tarhunta of "the land of the Seha River", one of the principalities within the Luwian Arzawa complex in western Anatolia. This they did, allowing Manapa-Tarhunta to take back his kingdom. In 1274 BC, Karkisa is also mentioned among those who fought on the Hittite Empire side against the Egyptians in the Battle of Kadesh. Taken as a whole, Hittite records seem to point to a Luwian ancestry for the Carians and, as such, they would have lost their literacy through the Dark Age of Anatolia.

The relationship between the Bronze Age "Karkiya" or "Karkisa" and the Iron Age Caria and the Carians is complicated, despite having western Anatolia as common ground, by the uncertainties regarding the exact location of the former on the map within Hittite geography. Yet, the supposition is suitable from a linguistic point of view, given that the Phoenicians were calling them "KRK" in their abjad script, and they were referred to as krka in Old Persian.

=== Homer ===
The Carians next appear in records of the early centuries of the first millennium BC; Homer's writing about the golden armour or ornaments of the Carian captain Nastes, the brother of Amphimachus and son of Nomion, reflects the reputation of Carian wealth that may have preceded the Greek Dark Ages and thus recalled in oral tradition.

=== Old Testament ===
In some translations of Biblical texts, the Carians are mentioned in 2 Kings 11:4 and 19 (/kɑˈɽi/; כָּרִי, in Hebrew, literally "like fat sheep/goat", contextually "noble" or "honored"), (Note: Some versions refer to "captains", others to "the Carites" or "the Carians".) and perhaps alluded to in 2 Samuel 8:18, 15:18, and 20:23 (/kɽɛˈti/; כְּרֵתִי, probably unrelated due to the "t", may be Cretans). They are also named as mercenaries in inscriptions found in ancient Egypt and Nubia, dated to the reigns of Psammetichus I and II. They are sometimes referred to as the "Cari" or "Khari". Carian remnants have been found in the ancient city of Persepolis or modern Takht-e-Jamshid in Iran.

=== Greek and Roman Antiquity ===
The Greek historian Herodotus recorded that Carians believed themselves to be the aborigines of Caria, but they were also, by general consensus of ancient sources, a maritime people before being gradually pushed inland. Plutarch mentions the Carians as being referred to as "cocks" by the Persians on account of their wearing crests on their helmets; the epithet was expressed in the form of a Persian privilege when a Carian soldier responsible for killing Cyrus the Younger was rewarded by Artaxerxes II (r. 405/404–359/358 BC) with the honor of leading the Persian army with a golden cock on the point of his spear.

According to Thucydides, it was largely the Carians who settled the Cyclades before the Minoans. The Middle Bronze Age (MMI–MMII) expansion of the Minoans into this region seems to have come at their expense. Intending to secure revenue in the Cyclades, Minos of Knossos established a navy with which he established his first colonies by taking control of the Hellenic sea and ruling over the Cyclades. In doing so, Minos expelled the Carians, many of whom had turned to piracy as a way of life. During the Athenian purification of Delos, all graves were exhumed, and it was found that more than half were Carians (identified by the style of arms and the method of interment).

According to Strabo, Carians, of all the "barbarians", had a particular tendency to intermingle with the Greeks,

"This was particularly the case with the Carians, for, although the other peoples were not yet having very much intercourse with the Greeks nor even trying to live in Hellenic fashion or to learn our language ... yet the Carians roamed throughout the whole of Greece serving on expeditions for pay. ... and when they were driven thence [from the islands] into Asia, even here they were unable to live apart from the Greeks, I mean when the Ionians and Dorians later crossed over to Asia." (Strabo 14.2.28)

Indeed, the term barbarian was coined by Homer in reference to the Carians speaking an unintelligible language.

== Greek mythology ==
According to Herodotus, the Carians were named after an eponymous Car, a legendary early king and a brother of Lydus and Mysus, also eponymous founders respectively of Lydians and Mysians, and all sons of Atys.

Homer records that Miletus (later an Ionian city), together with the mountain of Phthries, the river Maeander and the crests of Mount Mycale were held by the Carians at the time of the Trojan War and that the Carians, qualified by the poet as being of incomprehensible speech, joined the Trojans against the Achaeans under the leadership of Nastes, brother of Amphimachos ("he who fights both ways") and son of Nomion. These figures appear only in the Iliad and in a list in Dares of Phrygia's epitome of the Trojan War.

Classical Greeks would often claim that part of Caria to the north was originally colonized by Ionian Greeks before the Dorians.

The Greek goddess Hecate possibly originated among the Carians. Indeed, most theophoric names invoking Hecate, such as Hecataeus or Hecatomnus, the father of Mausolus, are attested in Caria.

== Carians and Leleges ==
The Carians were often linked by Greek writers to the Leleges, but the exact nature of the relationship between Carians and Leleges remains mysterious. The two groups seem to have been distinct, but later intermingled with each other. Strabo wrote that they were so intermingled that they were often confounded with each other. However, Athenaeus stated that the Leleges stood in relation to the Carians as the Helots stood to the Lacedaemonians. This confusion of the two peoples is found also in Herodotus, who wrote that the Carians, when they were allegedly living amid the Cyclades, were known as Leleges.

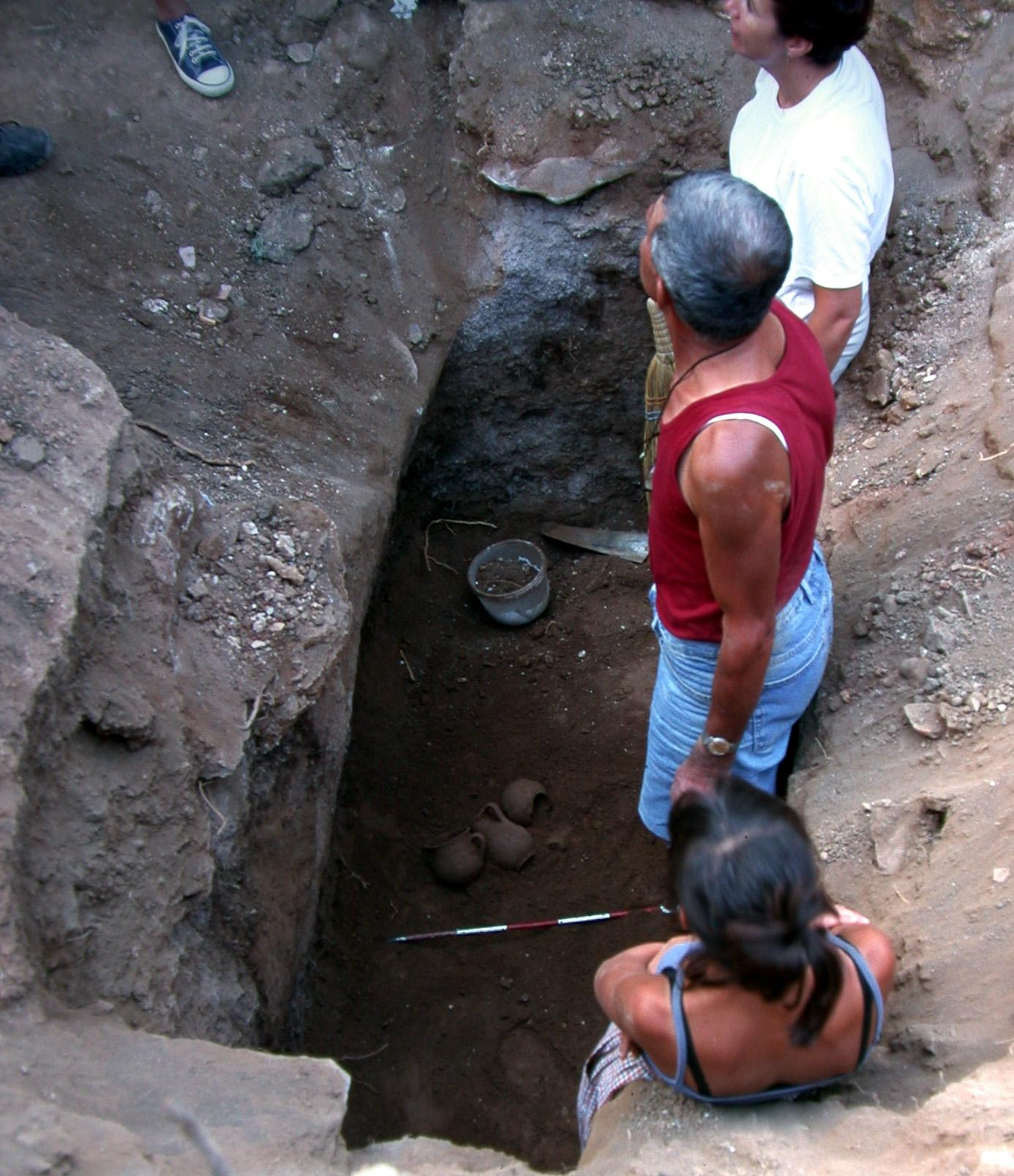
Archaeologists studying a Carian tomb in Milas, Beçin.

== Language ==
The Carian language belongs to the Luwic group of the Anatolian family of languages. Other Luwic languages besides Luwian proper are Lycian and Milyan (Lycian B). Although the ancestors of Carian and Lycian must have been very close to Luwian, it is probably incorrect to claim that they are linear descendants of Luwian. It is possible that the speakers of Proto-Carian, or the common ancestor of Carian and Lycian, supplied the elites of the Bronze Age kingdom of Arzawa, the population of which partly consisted of Lydians.

An important evidence of the Carians' own belief in their blood ties and cultural affinity with the Lydians and Mysians is the admittance, apart from theirs, exclusively of Lydians and Mysians to the temple of the "Carian Zeus" in their first capital that was Mylasa.

== Religion ==
One of the Carian ritual centers was Mylasa, where they worshipped their supreme god, called "the Carian Zeus" by Herodotus. Unlike Zeus, this was a warrior god.

It is possible that the goddess Hecate, the patron of pathways and crossroads, originated among the Carians. Herodotus calls her Athena and says that her priestess would grow a beard when disaster pended.

On Mount Latmos near Miletus, the Carians worshipped Endymion, who was the lover of the Moon and fathered fifty children. Endymion slept eternally in the sanctuary devoted to him, which lasted into Roman times.

There is at least one named priestess known to us from this region, Carminia Ammia who was priestess of Thea Maeter Adrastos and of Aphrodite.

== Archaeology ==
Throughout the 1950s, J.M. Cook and G.E. Bean conducted exhaustive archaeological surveys in Caria. Cook ultimately concluded that Caria was virtually devoid of any prehistoric remains. According to his reports, third millennium finds were mostly confined to a few areas on or near the Aegean coast. No finds from the second millennium were known aside from the Submycenean remains at Asarlik and the Mycenaean remains at Miletus and near Mylasa. Archaeologically, there was nothing distinguishing about the Carians since the material evidence so far only indicated that their culture was merely a reflection of Greek culture.

During the 1970s, further archaeological excavations in Caria revealed Mycenean buildings at Iasus (with two "Minoan" levels underneath them), as well as Protogeometric and Geometric material remains (i.e. cemeteries and pottery). Archaeologists also confirmed the presence of Carians in Sardis, Rhodes, and in Egypt where they served as mercenaries of the Pharaoh. In Rhodes, specifically, a type of Carian chamber-tomb known as a Ptolemaion may be attributed to a period of Carian hegemony on the island. Despite this period of increased archaeological activity, the Carians still appear not to have been an autochthonous group of Anatolia since both the coastal and interior regions of Caria were virtually unoccupied throughout prehistoric times.

As for the assumption that the Carians descended from Neolithic settlers, this is contradicted by the fact that Neolithic Caria was essentially desolate. Though a very small Neolithic population may have existed in Caria, the people known as "Carians" may in fact have been of Aegean origin that settled in southwestern Anatolia during the second millennium BC.

== See also ==
- Caria
- Carian language
- Carian script
- Mysians
- Lydians
- Lycians
