= Gygaea =

Gygaea or Gygaia may refer to:

- Lake Gygaea, or Gygaia, an ancient name of Lake Marmara in Manisa Turkey.
- Gygaea of Macedon daughter of Amyntas I
