= Alexander I of Macedon =

King of Macedon from c. 498/497 to 454 BC

Alexander I
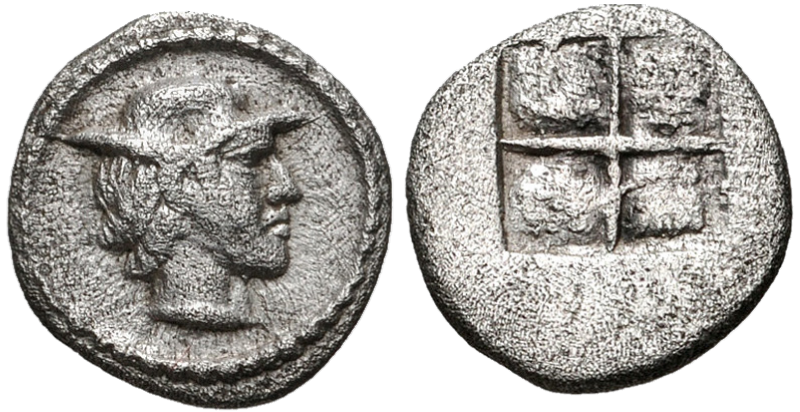
- Silver obol of Alexander I, struck c. 460–450 BC. Obv.: young male head wearing petasos; rev.: incuse square with four sections.

King of Macedon
- Reign: c. 498/497–454 BC
- Predecessor: Amyntas I
- Successor: Perdiccas II
- Died: 454 BC
- Spouse: unknown
- Issue more...: Perdiccas II; Alcetas
- Dynasty: Argead
- Father: Amyntas I

Alexander I (Ancient Greek: Ἀλέξανδρος, romanized: Alexandros; died 454 BC), also known as Alexander the Philhellene (Ancient Greek: φιλέλλην; lit. 'Supporter of Greece' or 'Greek/Hellene patriot' (Note: The term "Philhellene" was occasionally used in Antiquity to describe Greeks who patriotically defended their culture.)), was king (Note: While Greeks such as Demosthenes and Aristotle referred to them as such, there is no evidence that any Macedonian ruler prior to Alexander III used an official royal title (basileus).) of the ancient kingdom of Macedonia from 498/497 BC until his death in 454 BC. He was succeeded by his eldest son, Perdiccas II.

== Biography ==
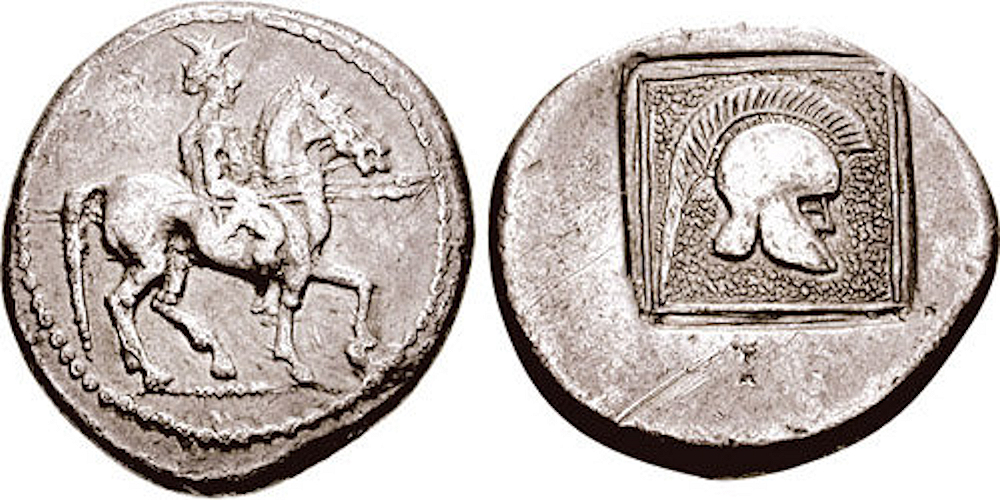
Coin of Alexander I in the decade following the Second Persian invasion of Greece (struck in 480–470 BC).

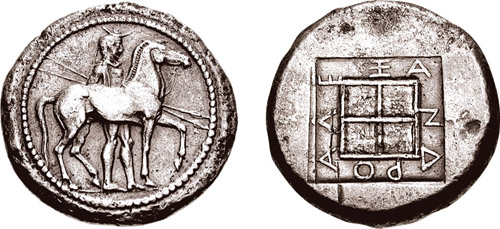
Silver tetradrachm of Alexander I, struck at the end of his reign, circa 465–460 BC.

Alexander was the only son of Amyntas I and an unknown spouse, whose name was perhaps Eurydice. He had a sister named Gygaea (Greek: Γυγαίη).

According to Herodotus, Alexander married Gygaea to the Persian general Bubares while a vassal of the Achaemenid Empire as a bribe to cover up his murder of a Persian embassy. Even though the marriage of Gygaea seems to be a real event, the story about the murder of the Persian embassy is widely regarded as a fiction invented by Herodotus or, at least, hearsay from his time spent in Macedonia. It is more likely that Amyntas arranged the marriage himself around 510, or that Alexander handled it after his father died.

Alexander came to the throne during the era of the kingdom's vassalage to Achaemenid Persia, dating back to the time of his father, Amyntas I, although Macedon retained a broad scope of autonomy. In 492 BC it was made a fully subordinate part of the Persian Empire by Mardonius' campaign. Alexander acted as a representative of the Persian governor Mardonius during peace negotiations after the Persian defeat at the Battle of Salamis in 480 BC. In later events, Herodotus several times mentions Alexander as a man who was on Xerxes' side and followed his orders.

From the time of Mardonius' conquest of Macedon, Herodotus refers to Alexander as hyparchos, meaning viceroy. Despite his cooperation with Persia, Alexander frequently gave supplies and advice to other Greek city states, and warned them of Mardonius' plans before the Battle of Plataea in 479 BC. For example, Alexander warned the Greeks in Tempe to leave before the arrival of Xerxes' troops, and notified them of an alternate route into Thessaly through upper Macedonia. After their defeat in Plataea, the Persian army under the command of Artabazus tried to retreat all the way back to Asia Minor. Most of the 43,000 survivors were attacked and killed by the forces of Alexander at the estuary of the Strymon river. Alexander eventually regained Macedonian independence after the end of the Persian Wars.

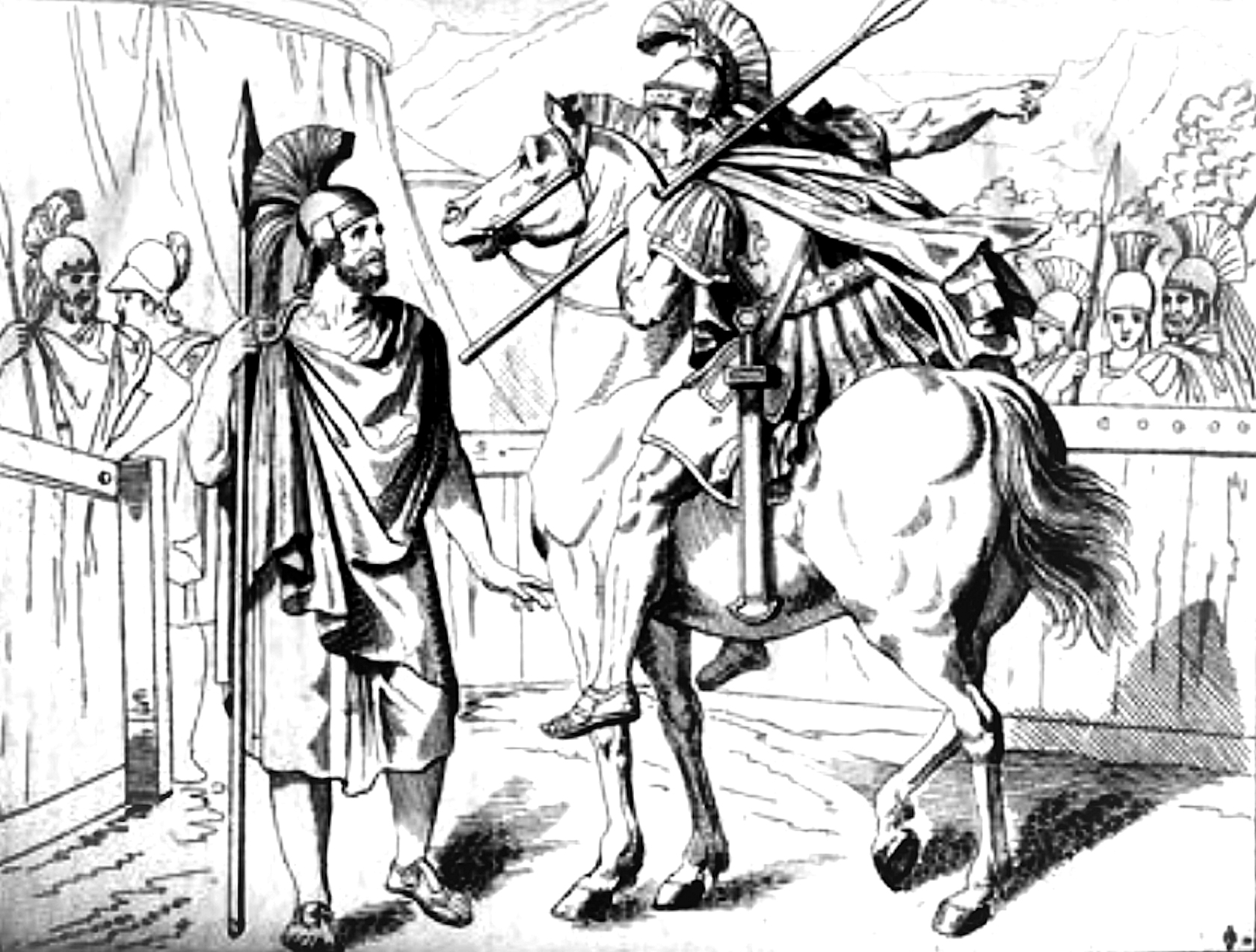
Aristides, commander of the Athenians, informed by Alexander I that delaying the encounter with the Persians would help further diminish their already low supplies. Battle of Plataea, 479 BC.

Alexander claimed descent from Argive Greeks and Heracles. After a court of Elean hellanodikai determined his claim to be true, he was permitted to participate in the Olympic Games possibly in 504 BC, a right reserved only for Greeks. He modelled his court after Athens and was a patron of the poets Pindar and Bacchylides, both of whom dedicated poems to Alexander. The earliest reference to an Athenian proxenos, who lived during the time of the Persian wars (c. 490 BC), is that of Alexander I. It was around this point that Alexander was given the epithet "philhellene".

Herodotus and Plutarch report another story about Alexander's assistance to the Greeks. On the eve of the decisive Battle of Plataea (479 BC), the Macedonian king secretly made his way to the Athenian positions at night and informed them of the enemy's plans. In his speech, Alexander indicated the patriotic motives of his actions: "Athenians, I lay up these words of mine as a trust to you, charging you to keep them secret and tell them to no one except only to Pausanias, lest ye bring me to ruin: for I should not utter them if I did not care greatly for the general safety of Hellas, seeing that I am a Hellene myself by original descent and I should not wish to see Hellas enslaved instead of free."

== Issue ==
Alexander and his unnamed spouse had at least six children:

- Perdiccas II, succeeded Alexander I.
- Menelaus, father of Amyntas II
- Philip
- Amyntas
- Alcetas
- Stratonice, married by her brother Perdiccas II to Seuthes I of Thrace.

== Family tree ==
Modern historians disagree on a number of details concerning the genealogy of the Argead dynasty. Robin Lane Fox, for example, refutes Nicholas Hammond's claim that Ptolemy of Aloros was Amyntas II's son, arguing that Ptolemy was neither his son nor an Argead. Consequently, the chart below does not account for every chronological, genealogical, and dynastic complexity. Instead, it represents one common reconstruction of the early Argeads advanced by historians such as Hammond, Elizabeth D. Carney, and Joseph Roisman.

Family and descendants of Alexander I
Individuals with disputed parentage or Argead ancestry are italicized.
- (1) Amyntas I (r. c. 513 – 498/497 BC)
  - (2) Alexander I (r. 498/497 – 454 BC)
    - (3) Perdiccas II (r. 454 – 413/2 BC)
      - (4) Archelaus (r. 413/2 – 400/399 BC)
        - (5) Orestes (r. 400/399 – 398/7 BC)
        - Argaeus II (r. 388/7 – 387/6 BC)
        - Pausanias
        - unnamed daughter Derdas of Elimea
        - unnamed daughter Amyntas II
      - (6) Aeropus II (r. 398/7 – 394/3 BC)
        - (8) Pausanias (r. 394/3 – 393/2 BC)
      - unnamed son
    - Menelaus
      - (7) Amyntas II (r. 394/3 BC)
        - (11) Ptolemy of Aloros (r. 368 – 365 BC)
    - Amyntas
      - Arrhidaeus
        - (9) Amyntas III (r. 393/2 – 370 BC)
          - From whom Philip II and Alexander III is descended.
    - Philip
      - Amyntas
      - Agerrus
    - Alcetas
      - Alexander
      - Agelaus
      - Arepyros
    - Stratonice Seuthes I
  - Gygaea Bubares
    - Amyntas

== See also ==
- Ancient Macedonians
- List of ancient Macedonians

Alexander I Argead dynasty Born: ? Died: 454 BC
Royal titles
Preceded by Amyntas I	King of Macedon c. 498/497–454 BC	Succeeded by Perdiccas II
