= Car (son of Zeus) =

Eponym of the Carians in Greek mythology

In Greek mythology, Car or Kar (Ancient Greek: Κάρ) was the brother of Lydus and Mysus, and the offspring of Zeus and Crete. He was regarded as the eponym and ancestor of the Carians.

== Mythology ==
Herodotus mentions Car, brother of Lydus and Mysus; the three brothers were believed to have been the ancestral heroes and eponyms of the Carians, the Lydians and the Mysians respectively. This Car was credited by Pliny the Elder with inventing the auspicia. According to Aelian, Car's parents were Zeus and Crete.

Car was also said to have founded the city Alabanda, which he named after Alabandus, his son by Callirhoe (the daughter of the river god Maeander). In turn, Alabandus's name is said to have been chosen in commemoration of his Car's victory in a horse fight— according to the scholar Stephanus of Byzantium, "Alabandos" was the Carian word for "winner in a horse fight". Another son of Car, Idrieus, had the city Idrias named after himself.

The tomb of Car was in the Carian city Souangela, giving that city its name— according to Stephanus, "Souangela" meant "tomb of the king" in Carian.
