= Alexander of Rhodes =

1st-century BC Greek admiral

- Born: Alexander

Alexander (Ancient Greek: Ἀλέξανδρος) was a prominent Rhodian who lived in the 1st century BC. In the war against Gaius Cassius Longinus he was at the head of the popular party, and was raised to the office of prytaneis, in 43. Soon after, he and the Rhodian admiral, Mnaseas, were defeated by Cassius in a naval battle off Knidos.
