= Alcetas (brother of Perdiccas II) =

Brother of the Macedonian king, Perdiccas II

- Died: 413 BC
- Issue: Alexander
- House: Argead
- Father: Alexander I
- Religion: Ancient Greek religion

Alcetas (Ancient Greek: Ἀλκέτας, romanized: Alkétas) was the brother of Perdiccas II, king of ancient Macedonia. Alcetas was the son of Alexander I and an unknown queen; he was a grandson of Amyntas I. Following the unexpected death of Alexander I in 454 BC, Alcetas obtained his own local realm and power base (arkhai). However, Perdiccas annexed the territory at some unknown point, but ultimately spared Alcetas' life. He evidently retained some responsibility in his brother's government as Alcetas name follows the king's on a list of Macedonian signatories to a peace treaty with Athens. Plato, through his interlocutors in Gorgias, wrote that Perdiccas' successor, Archelaus, murdered both Alcetas and his son Alexander.
