= Apaturius =

Apaturius (Ancient Greek: Ἀπατούριος) of Alabanda was a scene-painter of ancient Greece, whose mode of painting the scene of the little theatre at Tralles is described by Vitruvius, with the criticism made upon it by Licinius.

A different, unrelated Apaturius was a Gaul who, with Nicanor of Syria, assassinated Seleucus III Ceraunus in the 3rd century BCE.
