= Aridolis =

Ancient tyrant mentioned in Herodotus

Location of Alabanda in Asia Minor, where Aridolis ruled.

Aridolis (Ancient Greek: Ἀρίδωλις) was a tyrant of Alabanda in Caria, who accompanied the Achaemenid king Xerxes I in his expedition against Greece, and was taken by the Greeks off Artemisium in 480 BCE, and sent to the isthmus of Corinth in chains. His successor may have been Amyntas II (son of Bubares).

"They took in one of these ships Aridolis, the despot of Alabanda in Caria, and in another the Paphian captain Penthylus son of Demonous; of twelve ships that he had brought from Paphos he had lost eleven in the storm off the Sepiad headland, and was in the one that remained when he was taken as he bore down on Artemisium. Having questioned these men and learnt what they desired to know of Xerxes' armament, the Greeks sent them away to the isthmus of Corinth in bonds."

— Herodotus VII.195
