= Nicanor of Syria =

Nicanor (/naɪˈkeɪnər/; Greek: Nικάνωρ Nīkā́nōr) was a Syrian Greek who lived in the 3rd century BC under Seleucid Empire.

Together with a Gaul named Apaturius, he assassinated Seleucus III Ceraunus during his expedition into Asia against Attalus I in 222 BC. He was immediately seized and executed by order of the general Achaeus.

(Polybius 4.48; Eusebius Armenian text 165.)
