= Alabanda =

Former city of ancient Caria, Anatolia

- Ἀλάβανδα (Ancient Greek)
- Antiochia of the Chrysaorians
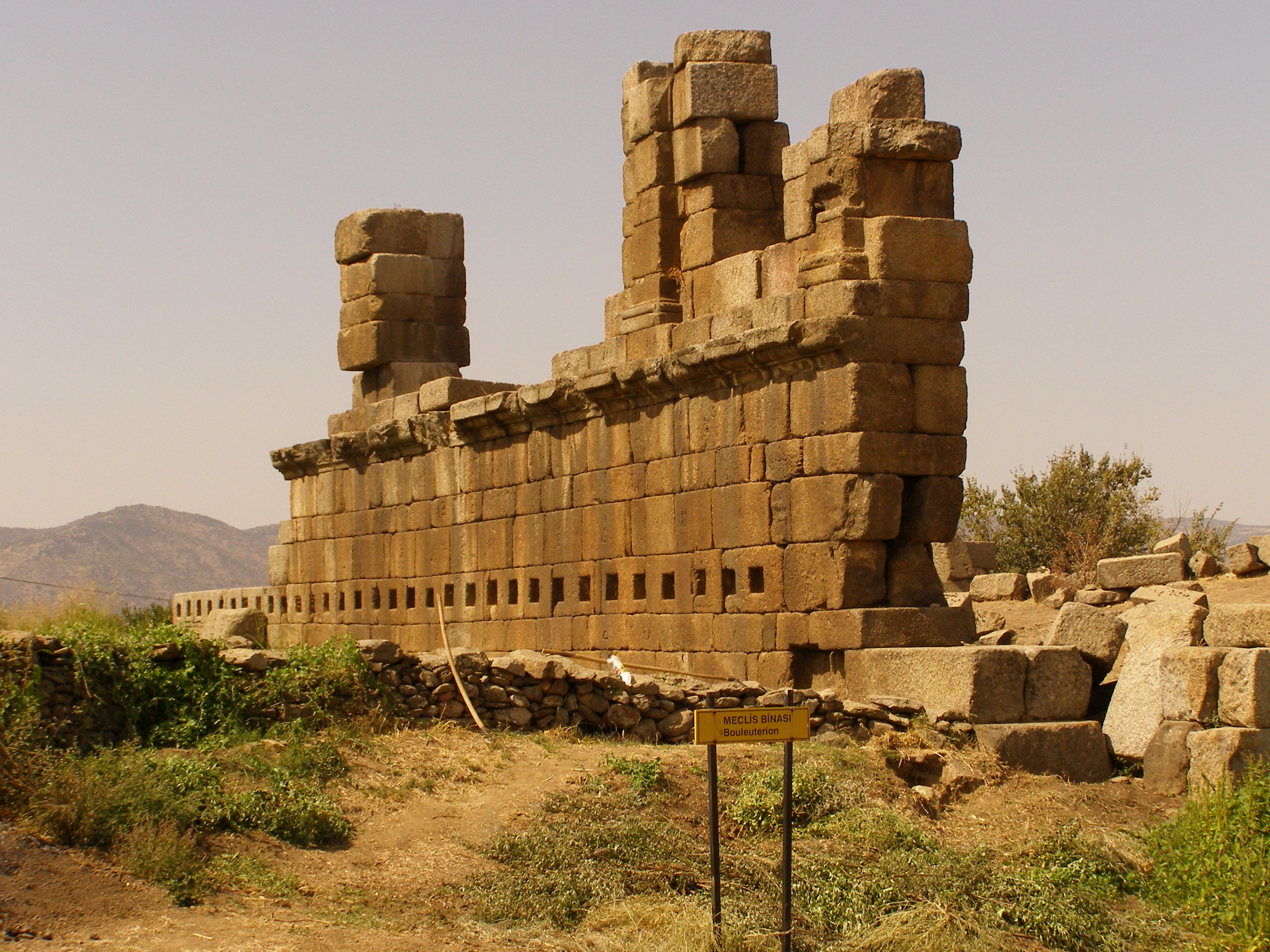
- Remains of Alabanda's bouleuterion

- Location within Turkey
- 37°35′30″N 27°59′08″E
- Type: Settlement
- Location: Doğanyurt, Aydın Province, Turkey
- Region: Caria

Alabanda (Ancient Greek: Ἀλάβανδα) or Antiochia of the Chrysaorians was a city of ancient Caria, Anatolia, the site of which is near Doğanyurt, Çine, Aydın Province, Turkey.

The city is located in the saddle between two heights. The area is noted for its dark marble and for gemstones that resemble garnets. Stephanus of Byzantium claims that there were two cities named Alabanda (Alabandeus) in Caria, but no other ancient source corroborates this.

== History ==
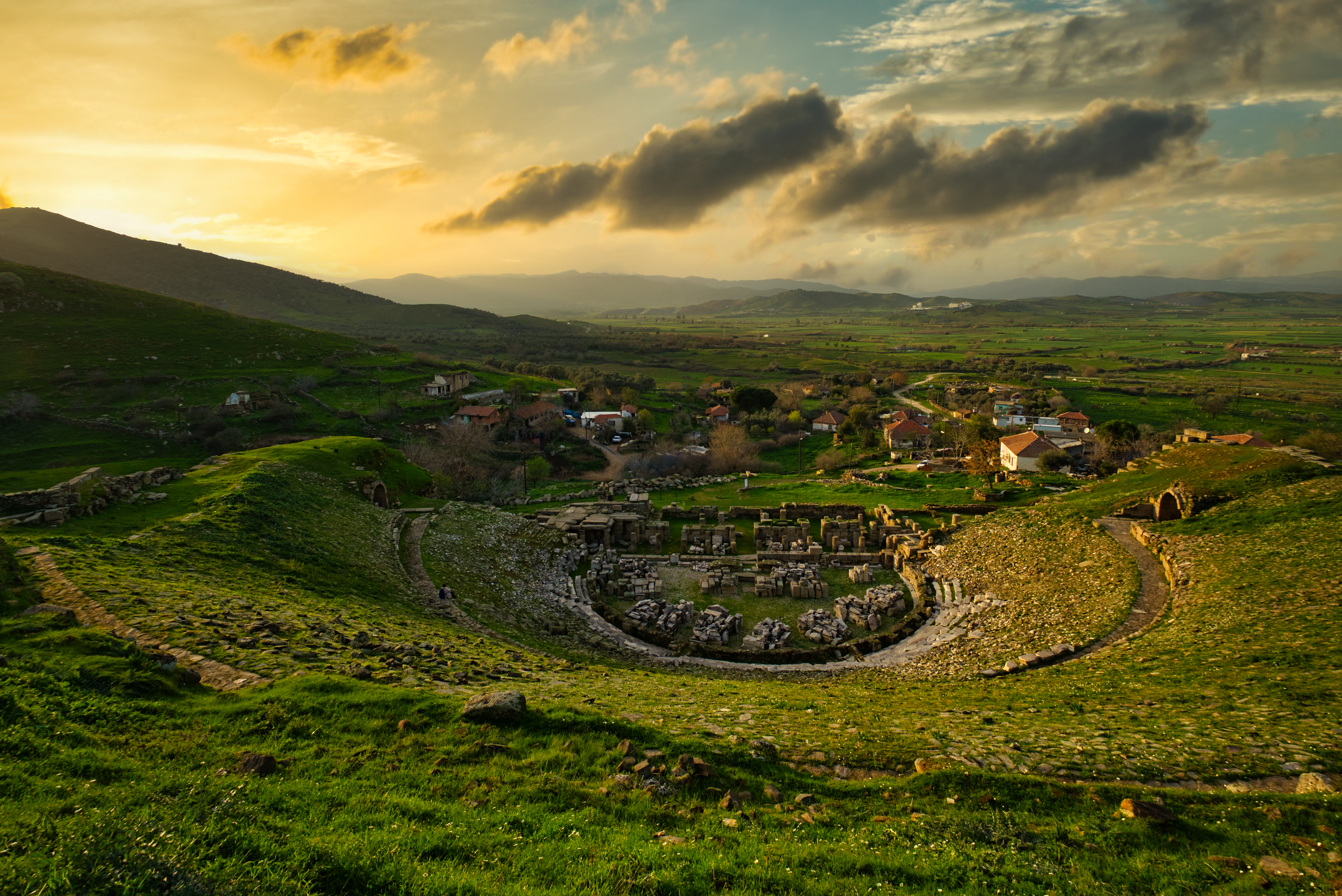
The Hellenistic theatre of Alabanda (Doğanyurt, Araphisar Mahalle) is located on a natural south-facing hillside.

According to legend, the city was founded by the Carian hero Alabandus. In the Carian language, the name is a combination of the words for horse ala and victory banda. On one occasion, Herodotus mentions Alabanda being located in Phrygia, instead of in Caria, but the same city was meant. Amyntas, son of the Persian official Bubares and grandson of the Macedonian King Amyntas, received control of the city from King Xerxes I (r. 486-465 BC).

In the early Seleucid period, the city was part of the Chrysaorian League, a loose federation of nearby cities linked by economic and defensive ties and, perhaps, by ethnic ties. The city was renamed Antiochia of the Chrysaorians in honor of Seleucid king Antiochus III who preserved the city's peace. It was captured by Philip V of Macedon in 201BC. The name reverted to Alabanda after the Seleucid defeat at the Battle of Magnesia in 190 BC.

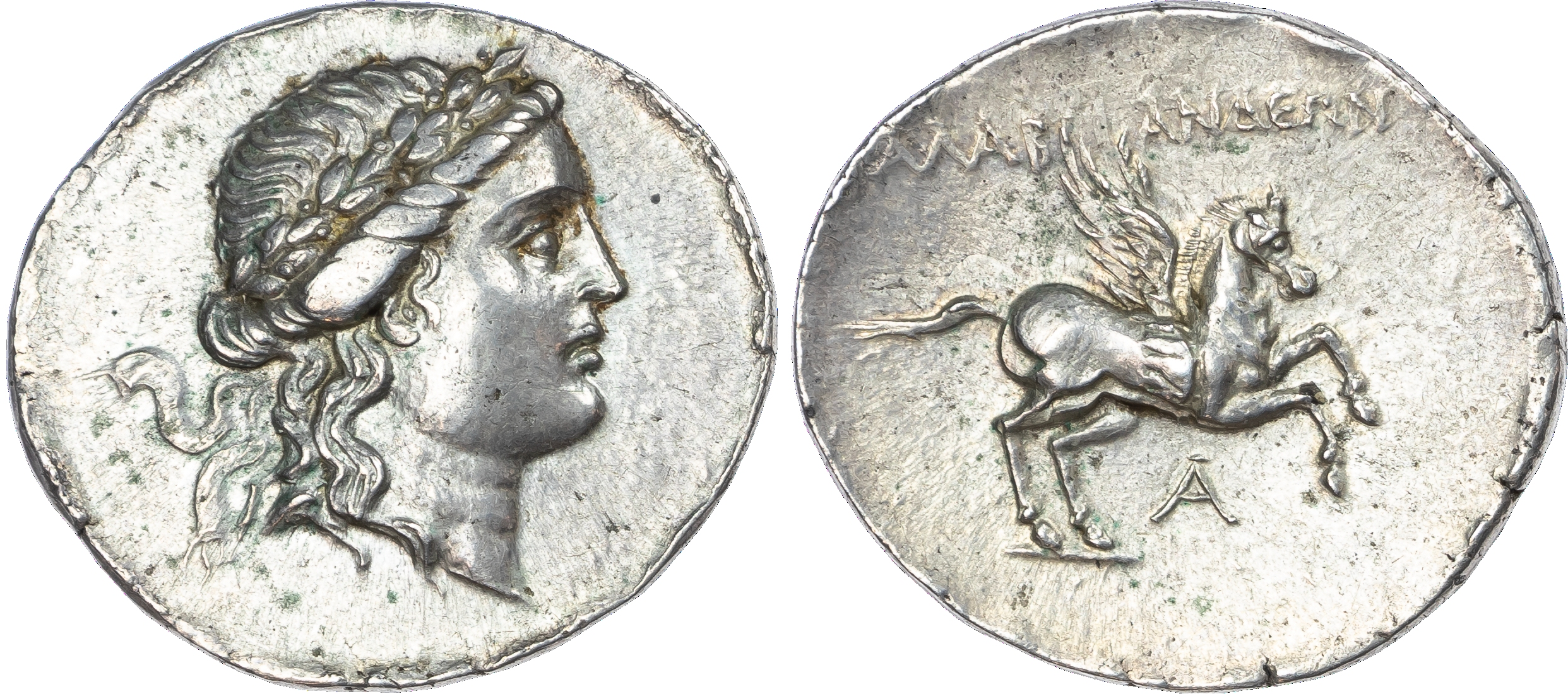
Silver Tetradrachm of Alabanda issued 167 BC, depicting Apollo and Pegasus

The Romans occupied the city shortly thereafter.

According to Cicero in Greece, they worshiped several deified human beings, at Alabanda there was Alabandus.

In 40 BC, the rebel Quintus Labienus at the head of a Parthian army took the city. After Labienus's garrison was slaughtered by the city's inhabitants, the Parthian army stripped the city of its treasures. Under the Roman Empire, the city became a Conventus (Pliny, V, xxix, 105) and Strabo reports on its reputation for high living and decadence. The city minted its coins until the mid-third century. During the Byzantine Empire, the city was a created as a bishopric.

The ruins of Alabanda are 8 km west of Çine and consist of the remains of a theatre and several other buildings, but excavations have yielded very few inscriptions.

== Ecclesiastical history ==
The names of some bishops of Alabanda are known because they participated in church councils. Thus Theodoret was at the Council of Chalcedon in 451, Constantine at the Trullan Council in 692, another Constantine at the Second Council of Nicaea in 787, and John at the Photian Council of Constantinople (879). The names of two non-orthodox bishops of the see are also known: Zeuxis, who was deposed for Monophysitism in 518, and Julian, who was bishop from around 558 to around 568 and was a Jacobite. No longer a residential diocese, Alabanda is today listed by the Catholic Church as a titular see.

== Notable people ==
- Aridolis, tyrant of Alabanda during the Second Persian invasion of Greece
- Amyntas, tyrant of Alabanda and grandson of Amyntas I
- Leon of Alabanda (Λέων), a Greek rhetorician and writer
- Apollonius the Effeminate, a Greek rhetorician
- Menecles of Alabanda (Μενεκλῆς), a Greek rhetorician, brother of Hierocles
- Hierocles of Alabanda (Ἱεροκλῆς), a Greek rhetorician, and brother of Menecles
- Apollonius Molon, a Greek rhetorician
- Apaturius, a Greek scene-painter
- Menedemus of Alabanda (Μενέδημος), a Greek general who participated in the Battle of Raphia

=== Bishops ===
- Theodoret (mentioned in 451)
- Zeuxis (? – 518 deposed) (Monophysite)
- Julian (about 558 – about 568) (Jacobite)
- Constantine (mentioned in 692)
- Constantine II (mentioned in 787)
- John (mentioned in 879)
- Saba (9th–10th century)
- Nicephorus (11th century)
- Anonymous (mentioned 11th century)
- William O'Carroll, (February 3, 1874 – October 13, 1880)
- Rocco Leonasi (March 30, 1882 – March 14, 1883)
- Giuseppe Francica-Nava de Bontifè (August 9, 1883 – May 24)
- Nicola Lorusso (June 23, 1890 – June 8, 1891)
- John Brady (June 19, 1891 – January 6, 1910)
- Joseph Lang (February 26, 1915 – 1 November 1924)
- François Chaize,(May 12, 1925 – February 23, 1949)
- José María García Grain, (March 10, 1949 – May 27, 1959)
- Michel Ntuyahaga (June 11, 1959 – November 10, 1959
- James William Malone (January 2, 1960 – May 2, 1968)

== Bibliography ==
- Turkey: The Aegean and Mediterranean Coasts, Blue Guides ISBN 978-0-393-30489-3, pp. 349–50.
- J. Ma, Antiochos III and the Cities of Western Asia Minor, ISBN 978-0-19-815219-4, p. 175

== Sources ==
- Briant, Pierre (2002). From Cyrus to Alexander: A History of the Persian Empire. Eisenbrauns. ISBN 978-1575061207.
- Roisman, Joseph; Worthington, Ian, eds. (2010). A Companion to Ancient Macedonia. John Wiley and Sons. ISBN 978-1-44-435163-7.
