= Democracy in Europe =

Map of 2026 V-Dem Electoral Democracy Index: 0.90–1.00 0.80–0.89 0.70–0.79 0.60–0.69 / 0.50–0.59 0.40–0.49 0.30–0.39 0.20–0.29 / 0.10–0.19 0.00–0.09 No data

Democracy in Europe can be comparatively assessed according to various definitions of democracy. According to the V-Dem Democracy Indices, the European countries with the highest democracy scores in 2023 are Denmark, Norway and Sweden, meanwhile the European countries with lowest democracy scores in 2023 are Belarus, Russia and Turkey.

== Changes in democracy ==
After the fall of Communism most countries in Central and Eastern Europe either democratized or re-democratized. Some democratic backsliding can be observed in parts of Europe, including Hungary and Poland. The V-Dem Democracy Report identified for the year 2023 Montenegro and Kosovo as cases of stand-alone democratization and North Macedonia as a case of U-Turn democratization, while Poland as a small but statistically insignificant uptick in liberal democracy index. Some view European democracies have become more consensual and less majoritarian over time. Increased importance of constitutionalism has been claimed.

== Measures of democracy ==
The table below shows European countries scored on 2 high-level V-Dem Democracy indices and 4 mid-level Democracy Component indices evaluating the state of democracy in year 2025 which were published in 2026.

Country	Democracy Indices		Democracy Component Indices			
Country	Electoral	Liberal	Liberal	Egalitarian	Participatory	Deliberative
Denmark	0.91	0.88	0.98	0.97	0.71	0.96
Norway	0.89	0.85	0.96	0.96	0.65	0.99
Sweden	0.89	0.85	0.98	0.9	0.65	0.93
Belgium	0.89	0.79	0.89	0.93	0.65	0.86
Ireland	0.89	0.82	0.93	0.87	0.63	0.91
Estonia	0.89	0.84	0.95	0.92	0.63	0.84
Switzerland	0.88	0.84	0.97	0.94	0.88	0.98
Luxembourg	0.87	0.78	0.89	0.95	0.56	0.97
France	0.86	0.8	0.94	0.81	0.63	0.93
Finland	0.85	0.81	0.96	0.81	0.64	0.9
Czech Republic	0.85	0.79	0.95	0.91	0.59	0.81
Austria	0.84	0.76	0.91	0.86	0.63	0.87
Latvia	0.83	0.75	0.91	0.87	0.66	0.81
Netherlands	0.83	0.77	0.94	0.89	0.59	0.9
Germany	0.83	0.78	0.97	0.94	0.66	0.98
Spain	0.82	0.74	0.91	0.84	0.64	0.83
Portugal	0.82	0.72	0.87	0.7	0.57	0.84
Iceland	0.81	0.72	0.9	0.92	0.65	0.88
Lithuania	0.79	0.71	0.92	0.88	0.67	0.84
Malta	0.78	0.62	0.77	0.9	0.62	0.81
Cyprus	0.77	0.66	0.86	0.9	0.56	0.78
United Kingdom	0.77	0.69	0.9	0.78	0.64	0.86
Poland	0.77	0.64	0.83	0.88	0.62	0.85
Italy	0.74	0.64	0.87	0.89	0.74	0.82
Greece	0.74	0.57	0.74	0.87	0.61	0.82
Slovakia	0.73	0.57	0.76	0.75	0.64	0.37
Slovenia	0.69	0.59	0.85	0.88	0.7	0.9
Croatia	0.69	0.59	0.87	0.78	0.62	0.7
Montenegro	0.64	0.5	0.77	0.78	0.57	0.81
Kosovo	0.63	0.46	0.69	0.69	0.46	0.56
Armenia	0.61	0.37	0.53	0.78	0.42	0.55
Romania	0.6	0.46	0.75	0.66	0.65	0.38
Bulgaria	0.6	0.5	0.83	0.71	0.62	0.78
North Macedonia	0.56	0.37	0.61	0.61	0.56	0.61
Moldova	0.55	0.45	0.79	0.77	0.66	0.78
Bosnia and Herzegovina	0.5	0.34	0.62	0.66	0.52	0.59
Albania	0.48	0.38	0.74	0.67	0.52	0.38
Hungary	0.42	0.32	0.67	0.62	0.54	0.3
Georgia	0.4	0.28	0.59	0.69	0.48	0.72
Ukraine	0.39	0.24	0.52	0.68	0.55	0.75
Serbia	0.3	0.21	0.52	0.73	0.55	0.52
Turkey	0.29	0.11	0.23	0.54	0.4	0.13
Azerbaijan	0.17	0.05	0.13	0.39	0.1	0.07
Russia	0.17	0.06	0.15	0.41	0.39	0.16
Belarus	0.16	0.04	0.09	0.77	0.14	0.06

== By country ==
=== Azerbaijan ===
Ahead of the 2024 Azerbaijani presidential election, Amnesty International reported an increased crackdown on the right to freedom of expression, repression of peaceful dissent, a coordinated assault on civil society, and the targeting of critical voices by President Ilham Aliyev.

=== Belarus ===
Unfair elections were reported in Belarus.

=== Georgia ===
Electoral fraud was reported at the 2024 Georgian parliamentary election.

=== Russia ===
Unfair elections were reported in Russia due to political repression and allegations of electoral fraud. Lack of freedom of the press resulted that most of Russians believe that the elections in Russia are mostly fair.

=== Serbia ===
In the 2023 Serbian parliamentary election electoral fraud was reported.

=== Turkey ===
Limited political freedom of the press is reported in Turkey.

== See also ==
- Act of Independence of Lithuania (1918)
- Athenian Revolution
- Age of Liberty (Sweden)
- Constitution of Norway (1814)
- Constitution of the Netherlands (1815)
- Constitution of Belgium (1831)
- Constitution of Denmark (1849)
- Czechoslovak declaration of independence (1918)
- Democracy in Africa
- Democracy in the Americas
- Democracy in Asia
- Democracy in the Middle East and North Africa
- Demokratizatsiya (Soviet Union)
- End of World War II in Europe
- Estonian Declaration of Independence (1918)
- French Revolution
- Glorious Revolution
- Magna Carta
- Greek transition to democracy (Metapolitefsi)
- Overthrow of the Roman monarchy
- People's Council of Latvia (1918)
- Politics of Europe
- Portuguese transition to democracy
- Representation of the People Act 1884
- Revolutions of 1848
- Revolutions of 1989
- Romanian revolution
- Rose Revolution
- Second Spanish Republic
- Second Polish Republic
- Singing Revolution
- Spanish transition to democracy
- Switzerland as a federal state
- Weimar Republic
- 1907 Finnish parliamentary election
- 1924 Greek republic referendum
- 1946 Italian institutional referendum
- 1989–1991 Ukrainian revolution
- 2018 Armenian Revolution
- Democratic legitimacy of the European Union
