= Alabandus =

Ancient Greek mythological figure

Alabandus (Ancient Greek: Ἀλάβανδος) was in Greek mythology a Carian hero, son of Euippus and Callirhoe, although which one is unclear (according to some traditions, his mother's name was Car).

== Mythology ==
Alabandus was the founder of the town of Alabanda, and was after his death worshiped by the inhabitants of that town as a divinity.

Cicero quotes the Athenian musician Stratonicus, who said "Let Alabandus be my enemy! But let Hercules be yours," for he had grown tired of the praises which the Carians were incessantly bestowing on their mythical founder, to the neglect of more Roman cults (e.g. Hercules, whom the Carians disdained).

Alabandus' original name is unknown. According to the legend, after he had won a prize in some sort of horse race, the people named him Alabandus, as the Carian word for "horse" was ala, and "victory" banda. Accordingly, his name was sometimes given as "Hipponicus".
