= Carminia Ammia =

Graeco-Roman public benefactress

Carminia Ammia (fl. c. 140 – c. 170 AD) was a Graeco-Roman public benefactress. She was the second wife of Marcus Ulpius Carminius Claudius the elder, a priest of the goddess Aphrodite in Attouda, Caria, in Asia Minor.

Carminia held the civic honour of stephanephoros, a title given to magistrates in some Greek cities who had been granted the honor of being allowed to wear a wreath or garland on public occasions. She also served as priestess of Thea Maeter Adrastos and of Aphrodite. Her first priesthood was later held by her son Marcus Ulpius Carminius Claudianus the younger. Her granddaughter, Ulpia Carminia Claudiana also held civic office. This granddaughter appeared on Roman coinage with Geta Caesar, the son of emperor Septimius Severus and brother of Caracalla.

== Sources ==
- R.van Briemen, The Limits of Participation (1996)
