= Amyntas of Mieza =

Amyntas
- Ἀμύντας

Amyntas (Greek: Ἀμύντας), son of Alexander from Mieza and brother of Macedonian general Peucestas, was appointed somatophylax of Philip III Arrhidaeus at Triparadisus in 320 BC. This appointment suggests that Antipater trusted Peucestas more than he did Peithon.
