= Mysus =

Greek mythological figure

Mysus or Mysos (Ancient Greek: Μυσός) was the brother of Car and Lydus in Greek mythology according to Herodotus.
