= Prytaneis =

City magistrates in ancient Athens

Site plan of the Ancient Agora of Athens where the prytaneis would preside over meetings (ca. 300 BC).

The prytaneis (πρυτάνεις; sing.: πρύτανις prytanis) were the executives of the boule of Ancient Athens. They served in a prytaneion.

== Origins ==
When Cleisthenes reorganized the Athenian government in 508/7 BCE, he replaced the old Solonian boule, or council, of 400 with a new boule of 500. The old boule consisted of 100 members of each of the four ancestral tribes. Cleisthenes created ten new tribes and made the boule consist of 50 men selected by sortition from each of these tribes.

== Organization ==
Each of the ten tribe's delegation would be an executive of the boule for one-tenth of the year rotating after, so that ten groups of prytaneis served each year. The executive officers were known as prytaneis and their term of office as a prytany (πρυτανία). Each day, for one 24-hour period, one member of the 50 prytaneis was selected by lot to lead, serving as the chairman (ἐπιστάτης epistates, "caretaker").

== Duties ==
The prytaneis served every day during their prytany, except during festival days. They formally called to meeting the full boule and the ecclesia of Athens. In practice many meetings were mandatory and evidence suggests that persuasive individuals could enjoin the prytaneis to call or not to call a supplementary meeting. The prytaneis received ambassadors from foreign states, held meetings that decided the desirability of holding an ostracism, and generally conducted the day-to-day business of the state. They ate at public expense in the tholos, a circular edifice constructed for them next to the boule house.

The selected chairman for the day administered the state seal and the keys to the state treasuries and archives. He would also serve as the head of the state, receiving and meeting with foreign envoys. This power made him in effect, the chief executive officer of Athens. No man was allowed to hold this office more than once.

During meetings of the ecclesia or boule, the current chairman also chaired these meetings. In the Fourth Century, this practice changed and the chairmanship of meetings was taken over by an office specifically created for this task called the proedroi (πρόεδροι). From that point on the chairman only directed meeting of the prytaneis.

== In other cities ==
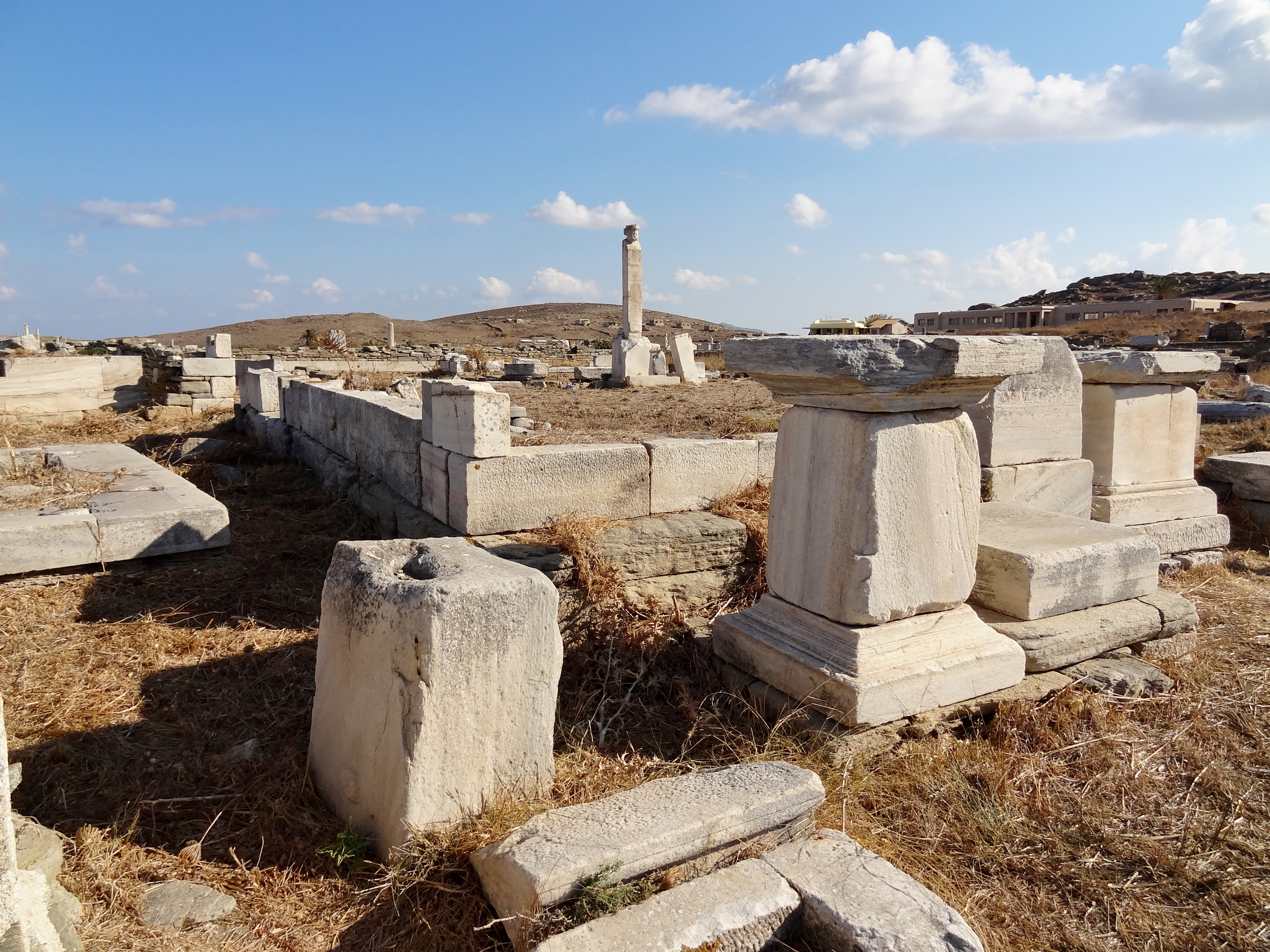
Prytaneion of Delos

Prytanis as a title is used in other ancient Greek cities including Rhodes, Alexandria and other cities along the west coast of Asia Minor. Offices that use this title usually have responsibility for presiding over councils of some kind. In the city of Miletus, the prytanis had enough power that he was able to become a tyrannos.

== Etymology ==
The term (like basileus or tyrannos) is probably of Pre-Greek etymology (possibly cognate to Etruscan (e)prθni).

== Sources ==
- Aristotle. Athenian Constitution, trans H. Rackham. Cambridge, MA: Harvard University Press. 1952.
- Hansen, Mogens H. The Athenian Democracy in the Age of Demosthenes: Structure, Principles and Ideology. Oxford: Blackwell Publishing, 1991.
- Rhodes, P. J. The Athenian Boule. Oxford: Clarendon Press, 1972.
- Hignett, Charles. A History of the Athenian Constitution. Oxford, 1962. ISBN 0-19-814213-7
- Beekes, Robert (2009). Etymological Dictionary of Greek. Brill Publishers. ISBN 9789004174184
