= Bubares =

5th century BC Persian nobleman

- Born: 6th century BC
- Died: after 480 BC
- Spouse: Gygaea of Macedon
- Children: Amyntas (son of Bubares)
- Father: Megabazus

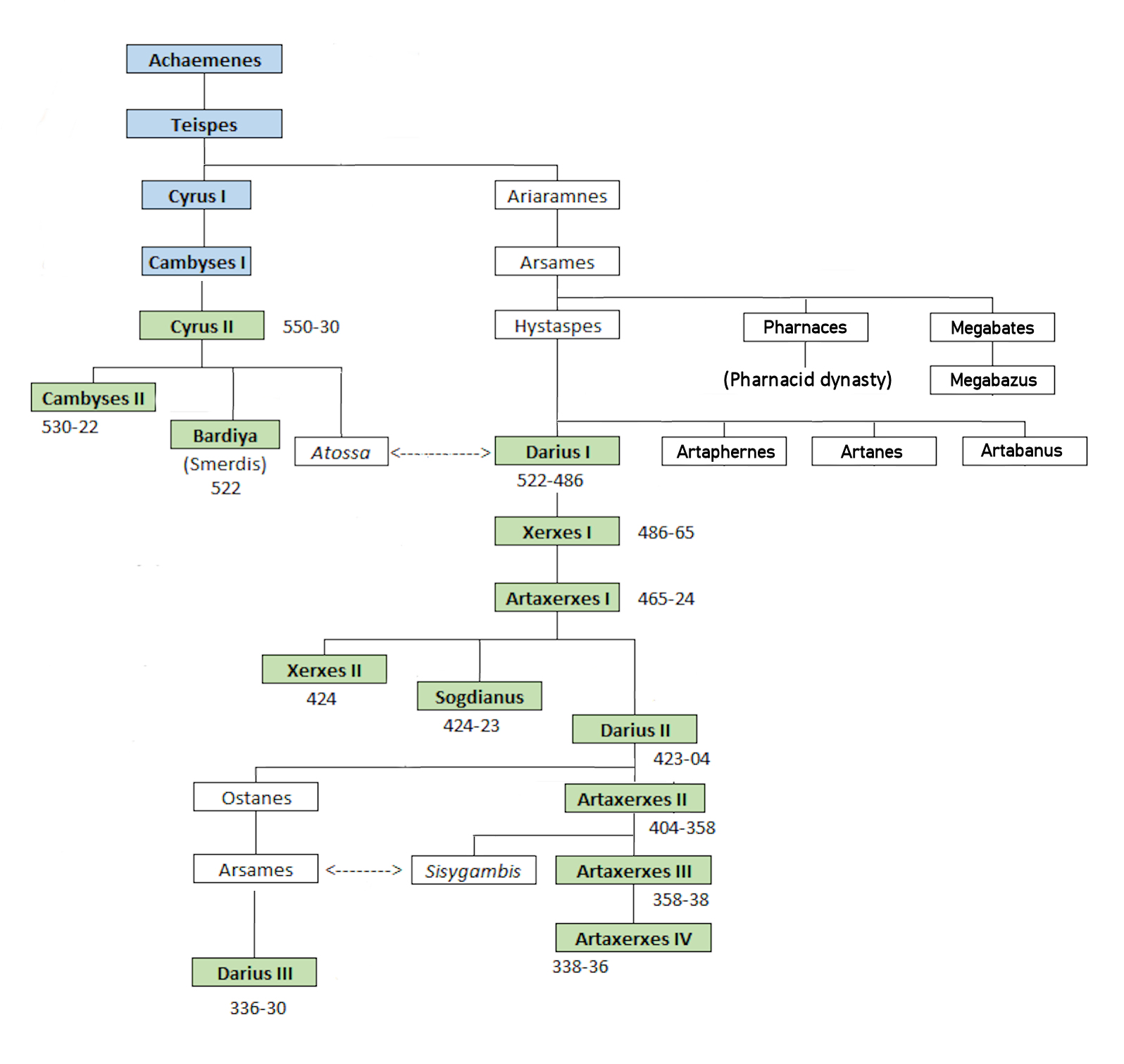
Bubares was son of Megabazus.

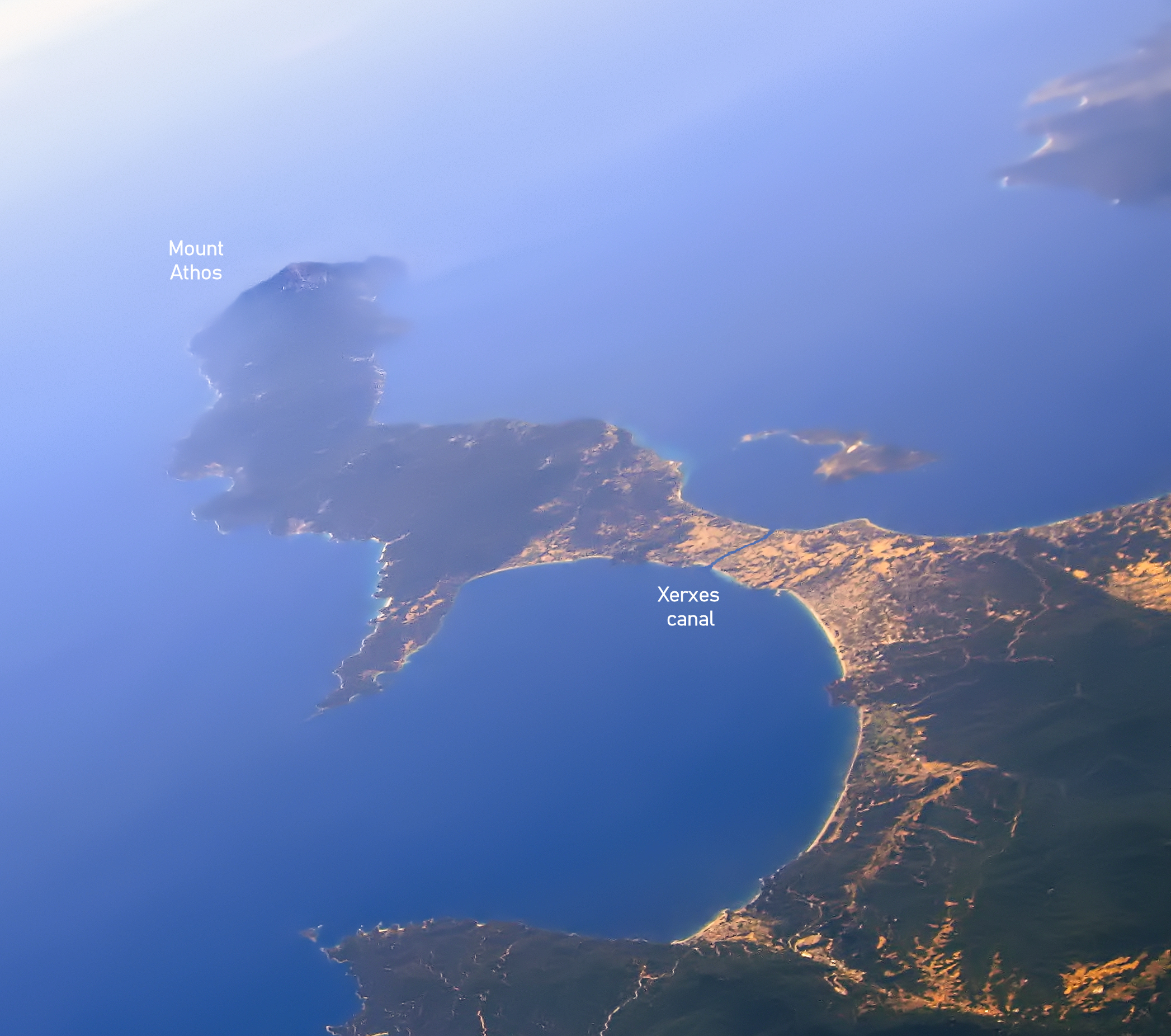
Bubares built the Xerxes Canal for the passage of the Second Persian invasion of Greece. Mount Athos peninsula from the stratosphere (at an altitude of 23 km), and simulation of the Xerxes Canal (seen from north).

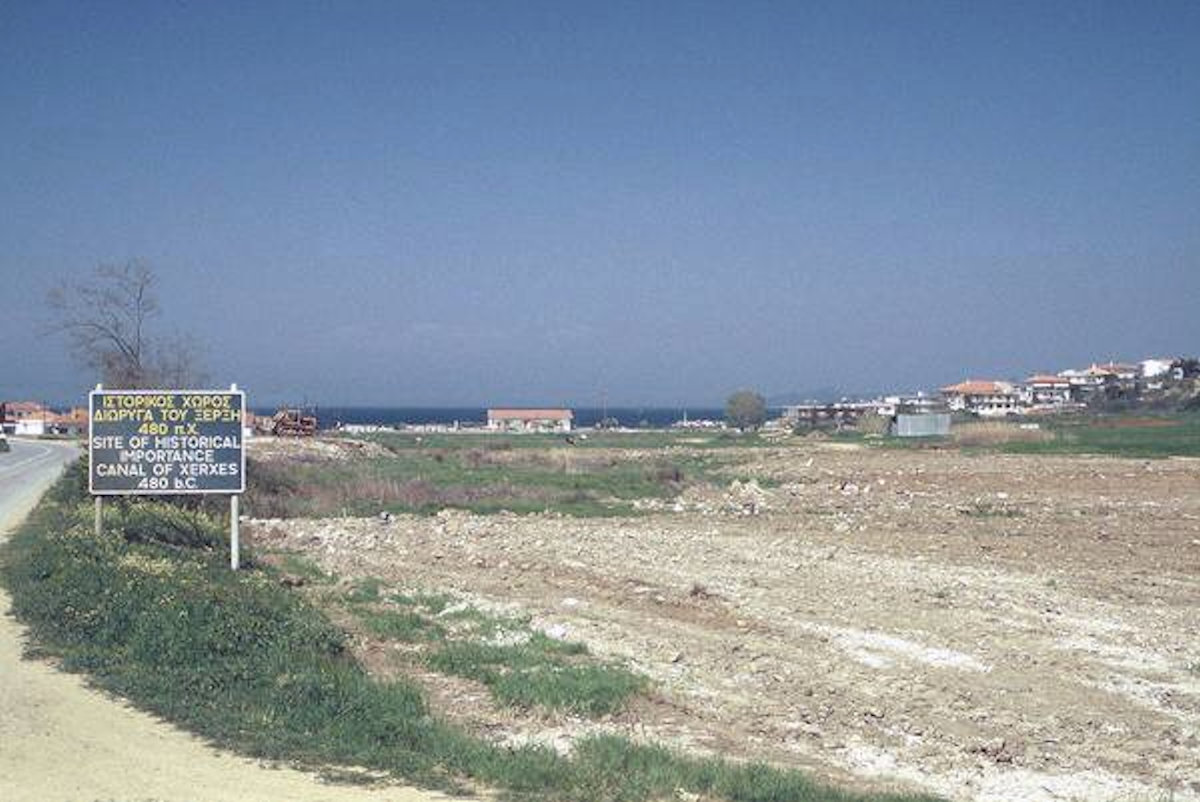
Northern end of the Xerxes Canal, now filled up.

Bubares (Greek: Βουβάρης, died after 480 BC) was a Persian nobleman and engineer in the service of the Achaemenid Empire of the 5th century BC. He was one of the sons of Megabazus, and a second-degree cousin of Xerxes I.

== Marriage to the sister of Alexander I of Macedon ==
Bubares was sent to Macedonia in order to settle a diplomatic conflict with King Alexander I. Alexander had been held responsible (as crown prince) for the murder of several members of a Persian delegation a few years earlier. The Persians had taken liberties with the Macedonian women of the Palace, and therefore had all been killed with their assistants by the king Alexander and his men. General Bubares was sent with a contingent of troops to investigate the matter. Alexander resolved the situation by surrendering a large sum of money and marrying his sister Gygaia to Bubares:

This was the fate whereby they perished, they and all their retinue; for carriages too had come with them, and servants, and all the great train they had; the Macedonians made away with all that, as well as with all the envoys themselves. No long time afterwards the Persians made a great search for these men; but Alexander had cunning enough to put an end to it by the gift of a great sum and his own sister Gygaea to Bubares, a Persian, the general of those who sought for the slain men; by this gift he made an end of the search. Thus was the death of these Persians suppressed and hidden in silence.

— Herodotus V 21-22

The couple had a son Amyntas named after their maternal grandfather. Amyntas was later officiated in Caria as a tyrant of the city of Alabanda. After staying a few years in Macedonia, possibly guarding the Axios valley, Bubares left circa 499-498 BC, possibly to attend to the matters of the Ionian revolt. Amyntas I of Macedon is said to have died soon after his departure.

== Xerxes canal ==
From around 483 BC, Xerxes I commissioned Bubares together with Artachaies to lead the construction of what is now known as the Xerxes Canal through the isthmus of the eastern foothills of the Chalkidike peninsula (near Ierissos). There, almost ten years before, the great Persian fleet of Mardonius had been shattered amidst the uneven waves off Mount Athos. The canal avoided the possibility of a repetition of this disaster. The construction of the canal was one of the most elaborate projects of antiquity and lasted three years, as workers were forcibly recruited from various peoples including the inhabitants of Athos.

First of all he had now for about three years been making all his preparations in regard of Athos, p337 inasmuch as they who first essayed to sail round it had suffered shipwreck. Triremes were anchored off Elaeus in the Chersonese; with these for their headquarters, all sorts and conditions of men in the army were made to dig a canal under the lash, coming by turns to the work; and they that dwelt about Athos dug likewise. Bubares son of Megabazus and Artachaees son of Artaeus, Persians both, were the overseers of the workmen.

— Herodotus 7.22

== Strymon bridge ==
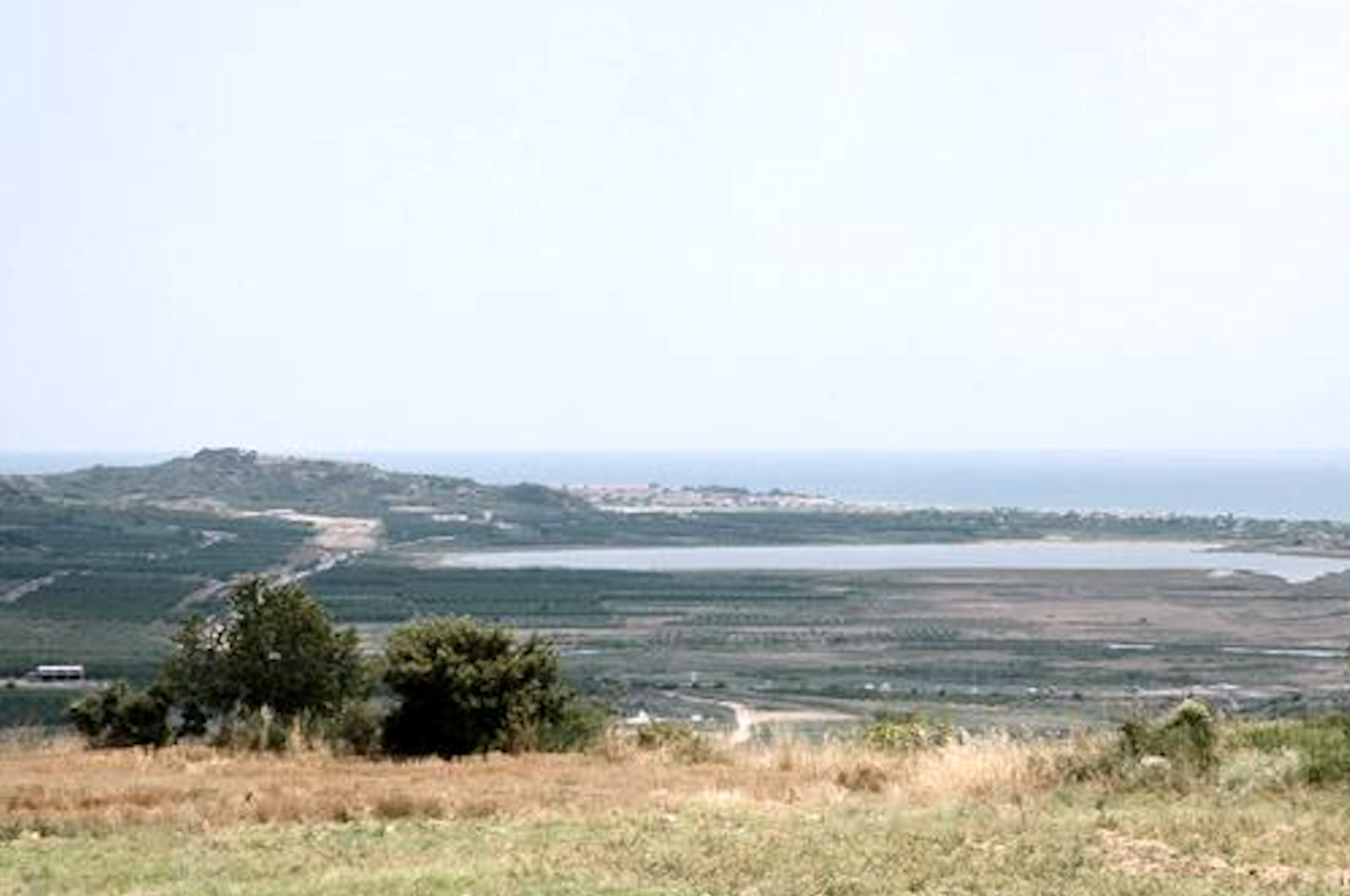
The ancient Persian fort at Eion (left) and the mouth of the Strymon River (right), seen from Ennea Hodoi (Amphipolis).

According to Herodotus "the same men who were charged with the digging were also charged to join the banks of the river Strymon by a bridge." The bridge on the Strymon river would also facilitate the progression of the Achaemenid invasion force.

== Sources ==
- Herodotus, History 5, 18–20; 7, 22; 8, 136
- Marcus Iunianus Iustinus 7, 3–4
