= Gygaea of Macedon =

5th century BC Macedonian princess

Gygaea (Greek: Γυγαίη) was a daughter of Amyntas I and sister of Alexander I of Macedon. She was given away in marriage by her brother to the Persian General Bubares. Herodotus also mentions a son of Bubares and Gygaea, called Amyntas, who was later given the city Alabanda in Caria by Xerxes I (r. 486-465).

There is also another Gygaea, second wife of Amyntas III of Macedon, whose son Menelaus was put to death by his half-brother Philip II in 347 BC.

== Sources ==
- Carney, Elizabeth Donnelly (2000), Women and monarchy in Macedonia, Norman: University of Oklahoma Press, p. 46, ISBN 0-8061-3212-4
- Roisman, Joseph; Worthington, Ian (2011). A Companion to Ancient Macedonia. John Wiley and Sons. ISBN 978-1-44-435163-7.
