= Elizabeth D. Carney =

American scholar of ancient Macedonia

Academic background
- Education: Duke University
- Thesis: Alexander the Great and the Macedonian aristocracy (1983)

Elizabeth Donnelley Carney is Professor Emerita of History at Clemson University who is known for her work in the field of gender studies in Ancient Macedonia.

== Biography ==
Carney grew up in the northeastern part of the United States in New Jersey and Pennsylvania. She has a B.A. from Smith College (1969), and an M.A. from Duke University (1973). In 1975 she finished her Ph.D. at Duke University. She began as an instructor at Clemson University in 1973, and was promoted to Professor in 1998. From 2010 until 2017, Carney was the Carol K. Brown Endowed Scholar in the Humanities. She became professor emerita in 2018.

== Career ==
Carney's research provides modern ideas on the role of women in the Macedonian and Hellenistic world. In 2020, Oxbow Books published a festschrift, a gathering of works in her honor, titled Affective Relations and Personal Bonds in Hellenistic Antiquity: Studies in honor of Elizabeth D. Carney.

== Selected publications ==
- Carney, Elizabeth (1988). "The Sisters of Alexander the Great: Royal Relicts". Historia: Zeitschrift für Alte Geschichte. 37 (4): 385–404. ISSN 0018-2311. JSTOR 4436070.
- Carney, Elizabeth Donnelly (1996). "Alexander and Persian Women". American Journal of Philology. 117 (4): 563–583. doi:10.1353/ajp.1996.0057. ISSN 1086-3168.
- Carney, Elizabeth Donnelly (2015). King and court in ancient Macedonia: rivalry, treason and conspiracy. Swansea: The Classical Press of Wales. ISBN 978-1-905125-98-2.
- Carney, Elizabeth Donnelly (2021). Women and monarchy in Macedonia (Paperback published ed.). Norman: University of Oklahoma Press. ISBN 978-0-8061-6874-6.
- Carney, Elizabeth Donnelly (2022). Eurydice and the Birth of Macedonian Power. WOMEN IN ANTIQUITY. New York: Oxford University Press Inc. ISBN 978-0-19-767229-7.
