= Amyntas (son of Bubares) =

5th-century BC Persian official of Macedonian noble descent

Location of Alabanda in Asia Minor, received from Xerxes by Amyntas II.

Amyntas was the son of the Persian official Bubares by his Macedonian wife Gygaea. He was named after his maternal grandfather, Amyntas I, who ruled Macedonia as a Persian subject from 512/511 BC. Later, King Xerxes I (r. 486-465 BC) gave Amyntas the Carian city of Alabanda. Amyntas was possibly the direct successor of the tyrant Aridolis.

"Bubares, a Persian, had taken to wife Gygaea, Alexander's sister and Amyntas' daughter, who had borne to him that Amyntas of Asia who was called by the name of his mother's father, and to whom the king gave Alabanda, a great city in Phrygia, for his dwelling."

— Herodotus VIII.136

== Sources ==
- Briant, Pierre (2002). From Cyrus to Alexander: A History of the Persian Empire. Eisenbrauns. ISBN 978-1575061207.
- Roisman, Joseph; Worthington, Ian, eds. (2011). A Companion to Ancient Macedonia. John Wiley and Sons. ISBN 978-1-44-435163-7.
