= Amyntas I of Macedon =

King of Macedon, c. 512 – 498/497 BC

Amyntas I
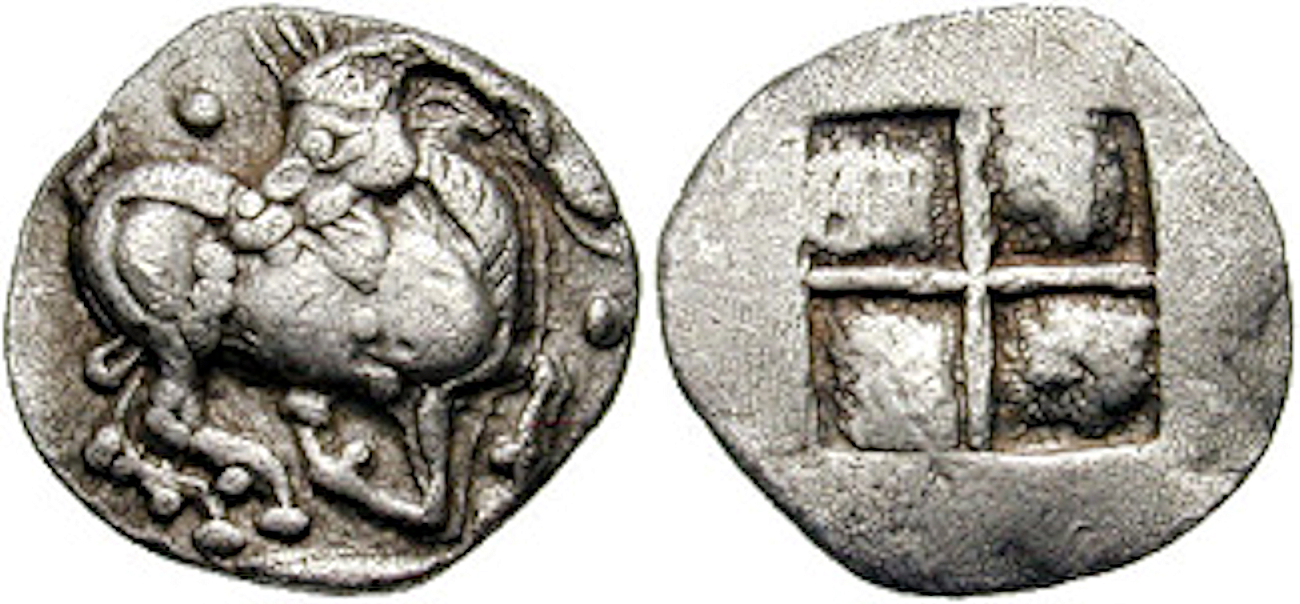
- Silver trihemiobol struck c. 510-480 BC, possibly a civic issue from Aegae. (Note: The earliest Macedonian coins were urban issues struck at Aegae c. 490 BC. Recent scholarship, however, attributes these early issues to the tribes of Bisaltia or the city of Galepsus. Alexander I was the first Macedonian king to mint his own coins.) Obv.: goat kneeling right, head reverted; rev.: incuse square with four sections.

King of Macedonia
- Reign: c. 512–498/497 BC
- Predecessor: Alcetas
- Successor: Alexander I
- Died: 498/497 BC
- Issue: Alexander I Gygaea
- Dynasty: Argead
- Father: Alcetas
- Religion: Ancient Greek religion

Amyntas I (Ancient Greek: Ἀμύντας) was king (Note: While Greeks such as Demosthenes and Aristotle referred to them as such, there is no evidence that any Macedonian ruler prior to Alexander III used an official royal title (basileus).) of the ancient Greek kingdom of Macedonia from at least 512/511 until his death in 498/497 BC. Although there were a number of rulers before him, Amyntas is the first king of Macedonia for which there is any reliable historical information. During Amyntas' reign, Macedonia became a vassal state of the Achaemenid Empire in 510 BC.

== Background ==
Amyntas was a member of the Argead dynasty and the son of King Alcetas. According to Herodotus, Amyntas was the sixth king of Macedonia. He had two children with an unnamed spouse: Alexander I and Gygaea.

== Reign ==
=== Relationship with the Persian Empire ===
In 513 BC, Persian forces led by Darius I crossed the Bosporus in a successful expedition against the Scythians, securing a frontier on the Danube in the process. Darius then returned to Sardis in Asia Minor and ordered his cousin Megabazus to conquer the rest of Thrace. Megabazus marched westward into the Strymon Basin in 512 or 511 BC, subjugating a number of tribes along the way, including the Paeonions, whom he had deported to Asia. Amyntas may have taken advantage of this power vacuum by crossing the Axios River and seizing their former territory around Amphaxitis.

In keeping with Persian practice, Megabazus dispatched seven envoys around 510 BC to meet Amyntas, most likely at the palace in Aegae, to demand "earth and water." Although the exact meaning of this request remains unclear, it appears that Amyntas met Megabazus' demands and invited the envoys to a feast. The Persians, according to Herodotus, requested the company of women after dinner, which Amyntas agreed to despite Macedonian customs. The women, identified as "concubines and wedded wives," sat across the table at first, but moved next to the envoys at their insistence. Flushed with wine, they began to fondle the women, but Amyntas remained silent out of fear of Persian power.

Alexander, enraged by their actions, asked his father to leave and let him handle the situation. Amyntas advised caution, but eventually left, and Alexander sent the women away as well, assuring his guests that they were only washing themselves. In their place, "beardless men" disguised as women and armed with daggers returned to the party and murdered all seven envoys. The Persians began looking for the missing embassy, but Alexander covered it up by marrying his sister Gygaea to the general Bubares and paying him a large bribe.

Modern historians are generally skeptical of the veracity of this story. It could have been fabricated by Herodotus to illustrate Alexander's cunning personality, or he could have simply repeated what he heard while visiting Macedonia. Furthermore, Amyntas, no matter how weak or foolish, is unlikely to have entrusted such a delicate diplomatic situation to his young son. Gygaea's marriage to Bubares is recognized as historical; Amyntas most likely arranged it himself or Alexander handled it after his father's death.

Historian Eugene Borza argued that by rejecting the murder of the Persian ambassadors, there is no longer any evidence that Macedonia was a vassal-state during Amyntas' reign. In accordance with this argument, Mardonius, not Megabazus, would actually subjugate the Macedonians in 492 BC. Nicholas Hammond, on the other hand, asserted that Macedonia remained a loyal subject as part of the satrapy of Skudra until the Persian defeat at Platea in 479 BC.

=== Amyntas and Athens ===
Amyntas was the first Macedonian ruler to have diplomatic relations with other states. In particular, he entered into an alliance with Hippias of Athens, and when Hippias was driven out of Athens he offered him the territory of Anthemus on the Thermaic Gulf with the object of taking advantage of the feuds between the Greeks. Hippias refused the offer and also rejected the offer of Iolcus, as Amyntas probably did not control Anthemus at that time, but was merely suggesting a plan of joint occupation to Hippias.

== Family tree ==
Modern historians disagree on a number of details concerning the genealogy of the Argead dynasty. Robin Lane Fox, for example, refutes Nicholas Hammond's claim that Ptolemy of Aloros was Amyntas II's son, arguing that Ptolemy was neither his son nor an Argead. Consequently, the chart below does not account for every chronological, genealogical, and dynastic complexity. Instead, it represents one common reconstruction of the early Argeads advanced by historians such as Hammond, Elizabeth D. Carney, and Joseph Roisman.

Family and descendants of Amyntas I
Individuals with disputed parentage or Argead ancestry are italicized.
- (1) Amyntas I (r. c. 513 – 497 BC)
  - (2) Alexander I (r. 497 – 454 BC)
    - (3) Perdiccas II (r. 454 – 413/2 BC)
      - (4) Archelaus (r. 413/2 – 400/399 BC)
        - (5) Orestes (r. 400/399 – 398/7 BC)
        - Argaeus II (r. 388/7 – 387/6 BC)
        - Pausanias
        - unnamed daughter Derdas of Elimea
        - unnamed daughter Amyntas II
      - (6) Aeropus II (r. 398/7 – 394/3 BC)
        - (8) Pausanias (r. 394/3 – 393/2 BC)
      - unnamed son
    - Menelaus
      - (7) Amyntas II (r. 394/3 BC)
        - (11) Ptolemy of Aloros (r. 368 – 365 BC)
    - Amyntas
      - Arrhidaeus
        - (9) Amyntas III (r. 393/2 – 370 BC)
          - From whom Philip II and Alexander III are descended.
    - Philip
      - Amyntas
      - Agerrus
    - Alcetas
      - Alexander
      - Agelaus
      - Arepyros
    - Stratonice Seuthes I
  - Gygaea Bubares
    - Amyntas

== See also ==
- Ancient Macedonians
- List of ancient Macedonians

Amyntas I of Macedon Argead dynasty Born: ? Died: 498/497 BC
Regnal titles
Preceded by Alcetas	King of Macedon c. 512-498/497 BC	Succeeded by Alexander I
