= Earth and water =

Symbolic tribute demanded by the Achaemenid Persian Empire

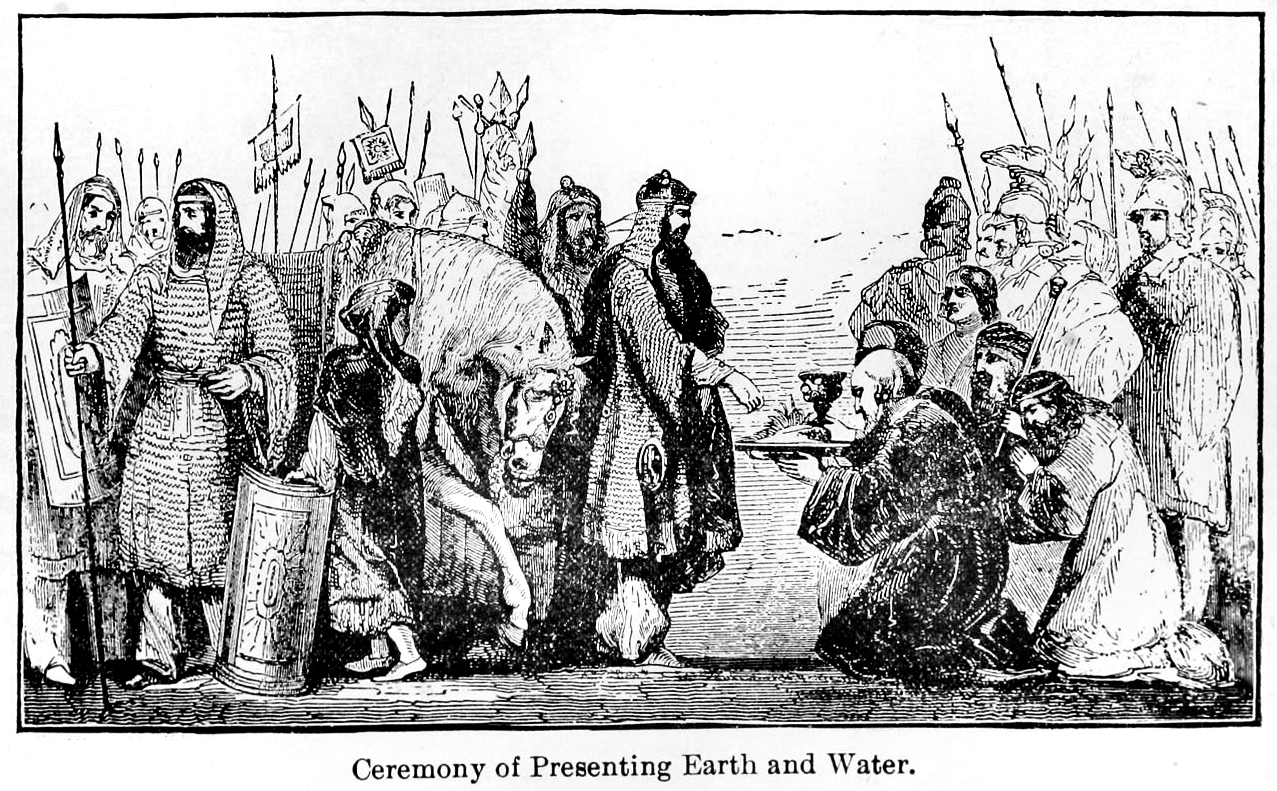
"Ceremony of Presenting Earth and Water" from History of Xerxes the Great (1900) by Jacob Abbott

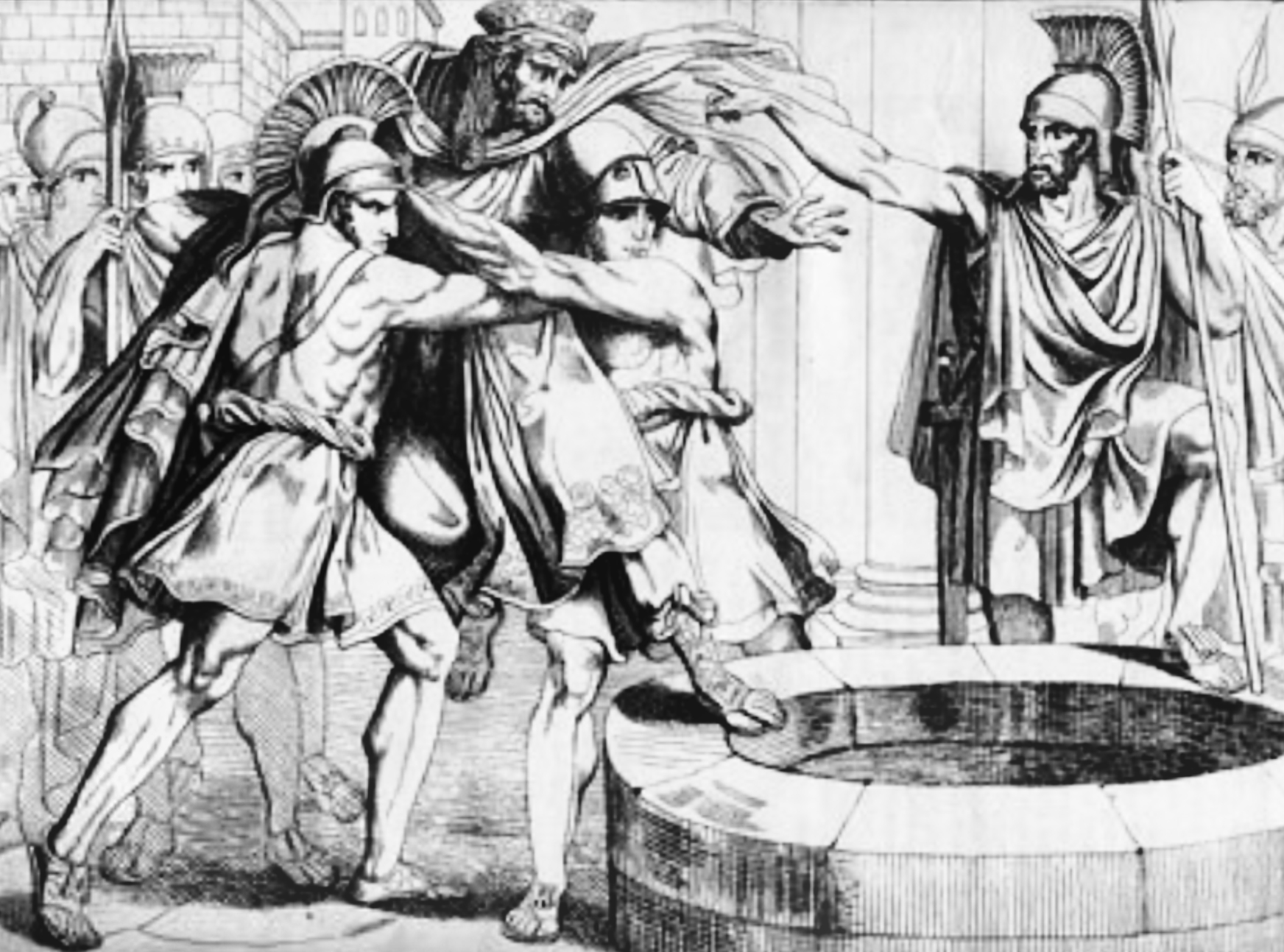
Envoys of the Achaemenid Empire are thrown into a well after asking for "earth and water" from Sparta prior to the second Persian invasion of Greece in 480 BC.

"Earth and water" (Greek: γῆ καί ὕδωρ; Persian: آب و زمین) is a phrase that represents the demand by the Achaemenid Empire for formal tribute from surrendered cities and nations. It appears in the writings of the Greek historian and geographer Herodotus, particularly with regard to the Greco-Persian Wars.

== Usage by Herodotus ==
In Book 4, Herodotus mentions for the first time the term earth and water in the answer of king Idanthyrsus of the Scythians to king Darius. In Book 5, it is reported that Darius sent heralds demanding earth and water from king Amyntas I of Macedon, which he accepted. It was also requested of the Athenian embassy to Artaphernes in 507 BC, which complied. In the 6th book, Darius sent heralds throughout Greece demanding earth and water for the king (Hdt. 6.48). There were not many city-states that refused. In Book 7, he recounts that when the Persians sent envoys to the Spartans and to the Athenians demanding the traditional symbol of surrender, an offering of soil and water, the Spartans threw them into a well and the Athenians threw them into a gorge, suggesting that upon their arrival at the bottom, they could "Dig it out for yourselves."

Just before the second Persian invasion of Greece by Xerxes, the Spartans voluntarily sent two men of noble birth to Susa for execution, in atonement for the death of the Darius' heralds. This did not satisfy Xerxes who punished the Greeks by defeating the Spartan Army and destroying Athens.

== Interpretation ==
The demand for earth and water symbolized that those surrendering to Persians gave up all their rights over their land and every product of the land. Giving earth and water, they recognized the Persian authority over everything; even their lives belonged to the king of Persians. Then negotiations would take place to specify the obligations and the benefits of the liegemen.

According to the modern historian J. M. Balcer, the significance of earth and water is that they were Zoroastrian symbols and representative of vassalage to the Persian Empire. "Persian heralds traveled throughout Greece demanding the recognition of Persian Suzerainty and the Zoroastrian symbols of earth and water, the marks of vassalage...".

However, according to a new analysis by Daniel Beckman, the ritual of "earth and water" originated from a Neo-Assyrian practice that represented the violent conquest of a city, while in the Achaemenid Empire it symbolized peaceful, voluntary submission.

== See also ==
- Come and take them, a Greek phrase attributed to the Spartan response to the Persian demand that they surrender their weapons
