= Skudra =

Achaemenid province

Achaemenid Thrace 𐎿𐎤𐎢𐎭𐎼 Skudra (Old Persian)
- Satrapy of the Achaemenid Empire
- 513 BCE–c. 465 BCE
- Standard of Cyrus the Great

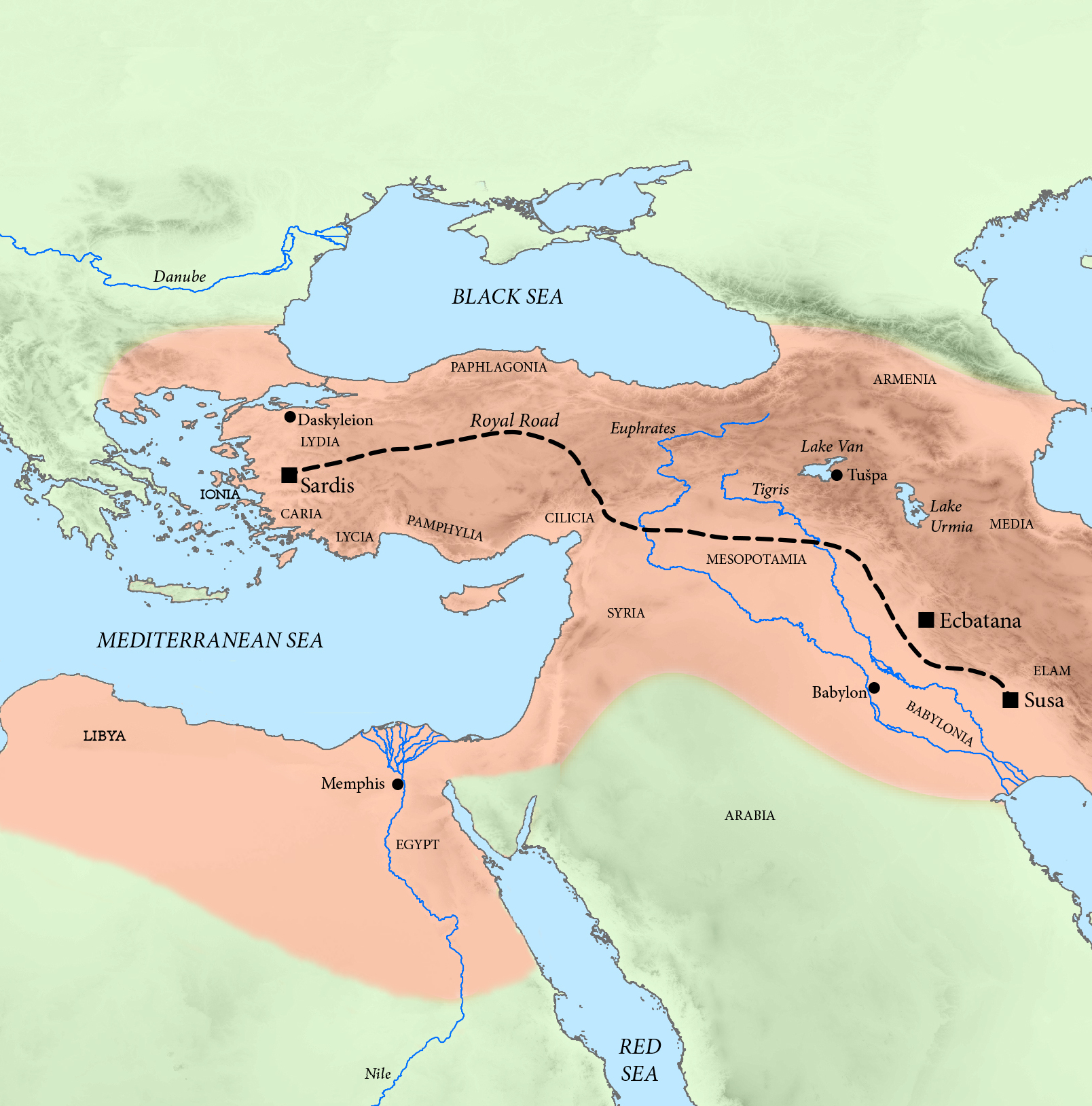
- Skudra was the westernmost territory of the Achaemenid Empire, comprising the area of Macedonia and Thrace, to the north of Greece
- Government
  - Type: Monarchy
- King or King of Kings
  - 522–486 BCE: Darius I (first)
  - 486-465 BC: Xerxes I (last)
- Historical era: Achaemenid era
  - Persian invasion of Thrace: 513 BCE
  - Ionian Revolt: 499-493 BCE
  - Re-subjugation of Thrace: 492 BCE
  - Conquest of Macedonia: 492 BCE
  - Macedonia overthrows Persian rule: 479 BCE
  - Evacuation of Doriscus: c. 465 BCE
Preceded by
Archaic Thrace
Kingdom of Macedonia
Succeeded by
Odrysian kingdom
Kingdom of Macedonia
Delian League

Skudra (Old Persian: 𐎿𐎤𐎢𐎭𐎼, romanized: Skudra) was a province (satrapy) of the Persian Achaemenid Empire in Europe between 510s BC and 479 BC. Its name is attested in Persian and Egyptian inscriptions (an Egyptian record of c. 498–497 BC, and a list on the tomb of Darius the Great at Naqsh-e Rustam, c. 486 BC. It is believed to have comprised the lands now known as Thrace and Macedon.

== Name ==
The Old Persian name of the province, Skudra, was derived from the Scythian endonym *Skuδa, from which was also derived the Akkadian and Greek names for the Scythians, respectively Iškuzaya (𒅖𒆪𒍝𒀀𒀀) and Askuzaya (𒊍𒆪𒍝𒀀𒀀), and Skuthai (Σκυθαι).

The Scythian language had however undergone a sound change due to which the sound /δ/ had evolved into /l/ by the time of the Persian invasion, due to which the Scythian endonym in the Scythian language by then was pronounced as Skula. The derivation of Old Persian Skudra instead likely happened indirectly through the Median language, which had preserved the older Scythian form Skuδa due to early contacts between the Medes and the Scythians during the 7th century BC, before the sound change from /δ/ to /l/ was complete.

== History ==
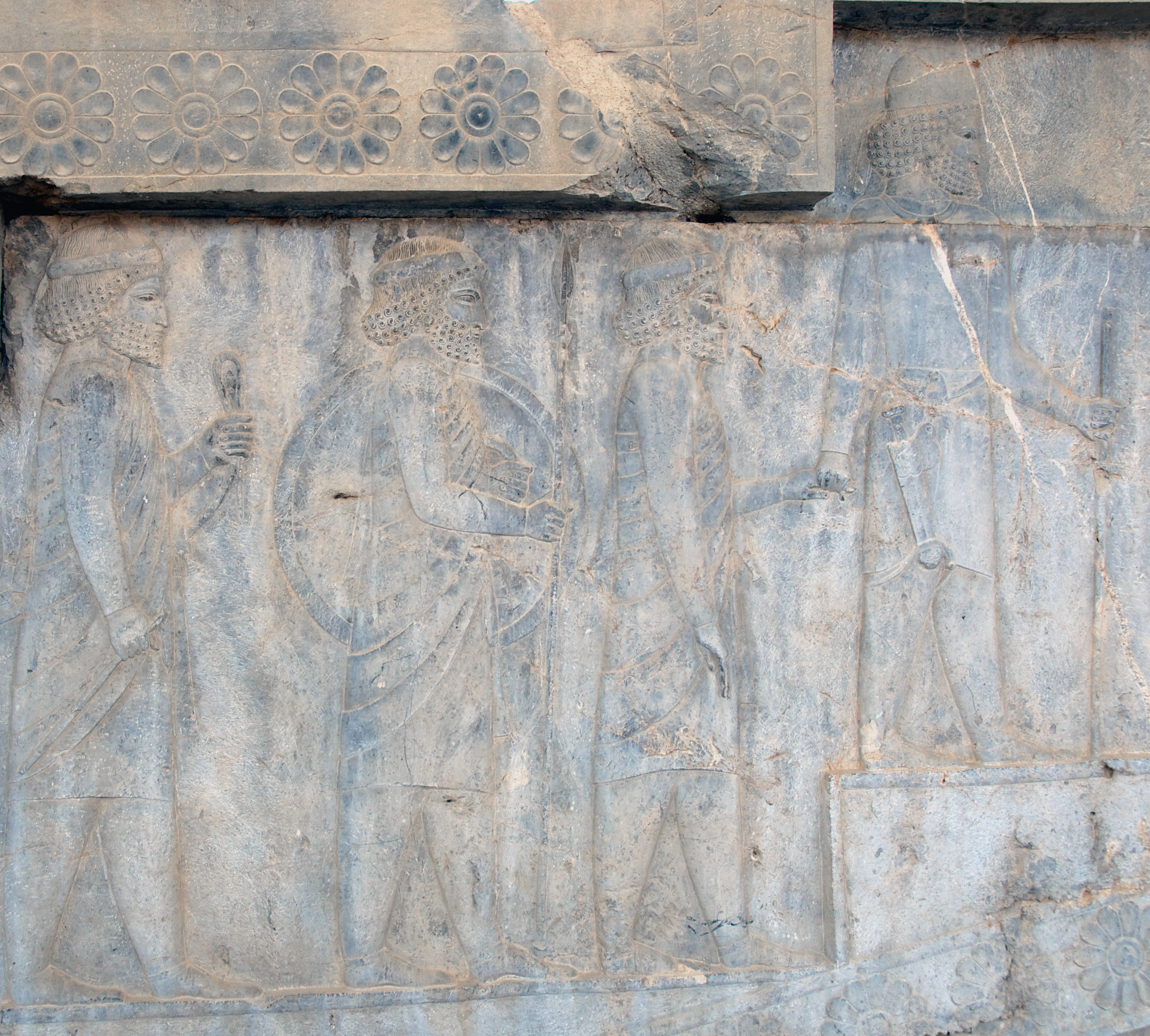
Skudrian delegation, relief from Apadana of Persepolis

The first Achaemenid military incursion in southeast Europe started in 513 BCE, when the Achaemenid king Darius I amassed an army and marched from Achaemenid-ruled Anatolia into Thrace, and from there he crossed the Arteskos river and then proceeded through the valley-route of the Hebros river. This was an act of conquest by Darius I, who during his march sent emissaries to the Thracians found on the path of his army as well as to the many other Thracian tribes over a wide area. All these peoples of Thrace, including the Odrysae, submitted to the Achaemenid king until his army reached the territory of Thracian tribe of the Getae who lived just south of the Danube river and who in vain attempted to resist the Achaemenid conquest. After the resistance of the Getae was defeated and they were forced to provide the Achaemenid army with soldiers, all the Thracian tribes between the Aegean Sea and the Danube river had been subjected by the Achaemenid Empire. Once Darius had reached the Danube, he crossed the river and campaigned against the Scythians, after which he returned back to Anatolia through Thrace and left a large army in Europe under the command of his general Megabazus.

Following Darius I's orders to create a new satrapy for the Achaemenid Empire in the Balkans, Megabazus forced the Greek cities who had refused to submit to the Achaemenid Empire, starting with Perinthus, after which led military campaigns throughout Thrace to impose Achaemenid rule over every city and tribe in the area. With the help of Thracian guides, Megabazus was able to conquer Paeonia up to but not including the area of Lake Prasias, and he gave the lands of the Paeonians inhabiting these regions up to the Lake Prasias to Thracians loyal to the Achaemenid Empire. The last endeavours of Megabazus included the conquest of the area between the Strymon and Axius rivers, and at the end of his campaign, the king of Macedonia, Amyntas I, accepted to become a vassal of the Achaemenid Empire. Within the satrapy itself, the Achaemenid king Darius granted to the tyrant Histiaeus of Miletus the district of Myrcinus on the Strymon's east bank until Megabazus persuaded him to recall Histiaeus after he returned to Asia Minor, after which the Thracian tribe of the Edoni retook control of Myrcinus. Once Megabazus had returned to Asia Minor, he was succeeded in Skudra by a governor whose name is unknown, and Darius appointed the general Otanes to oversee the administrative division of the Hellespont, which extended on both sides of the sea and included the Bosporus, the Propontis, and the Hellespont proper and its approaches. Otanes then proceeded to capture Byzantium, Chalcedon, Antandrus, Lamponeia, Imbros, and Lemnos for the Achaemenid Empire.

Ethnicities in Skudra

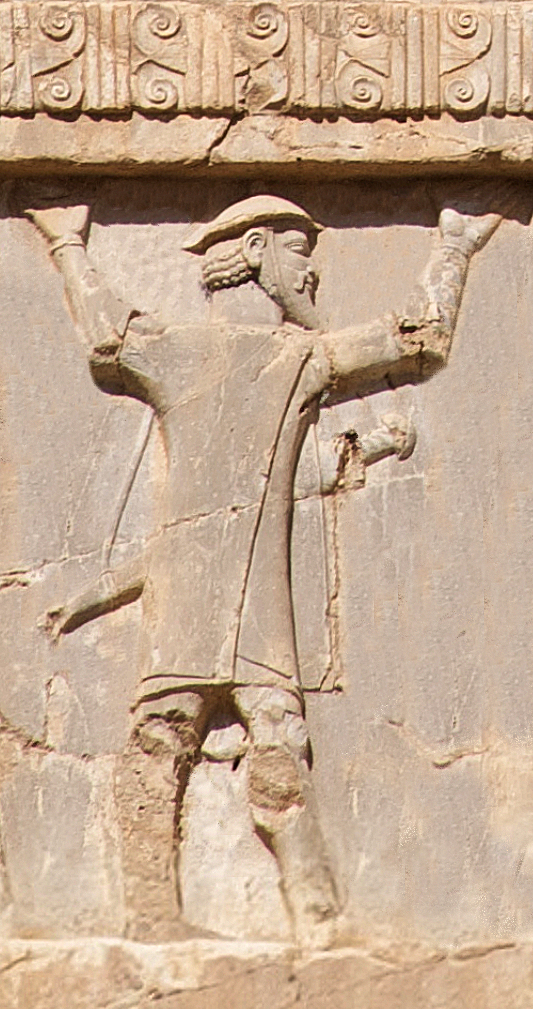
"Ionian with shield hat" (Macedonian) soldier of the Achaemenid army, circa 480 BCE. Xerxes I tomb relief.

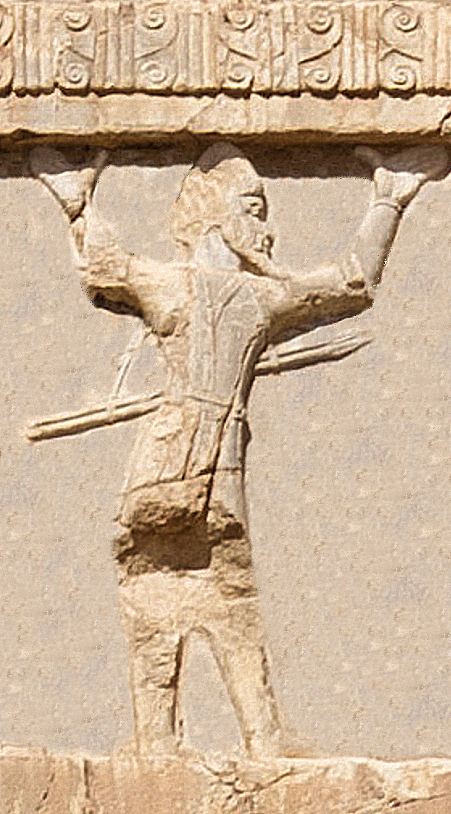
Skudrian (Thracian or Macedonian) soldier of the Achaemenid army, circa 480 BCE. Xerxes I tomb relief.

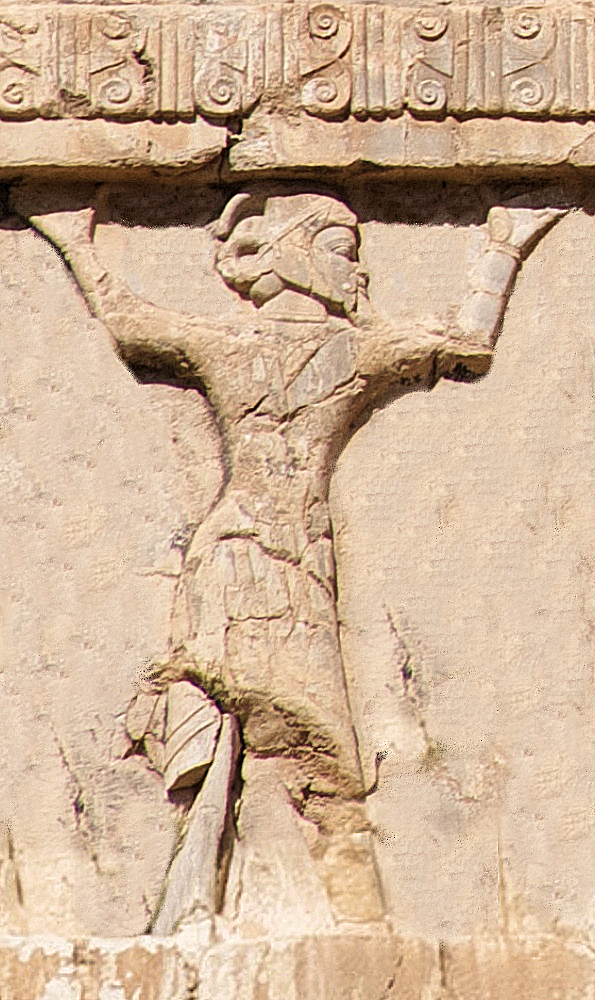
"Saka beyond the sea", soldier of the Achaemenid army, circa 480 BCE. Xerxes I tomb relief.

The area included within the satrapy of Skudra included both the Aegean coast of Thrace, as well as its Pontic coast till the Danube. In the interior, the Western border of the satrapy consisted of the Axius river and the Belasica-Pirin-Rila mountain ranges till the site of modern-day Kostenets. The importance of this satrapy rested in that it contained the Hebros river, where a route in the river valley connected the permanent Persian settlement of Doriscus with the Aegean coast, as well as with the port-cities of Apollonia, Mesembria and Odessos on the Black Sea, and with the central Thracian plain, which gave this region an important strategic value. Persian sources describe the province as being populated by three groups: the Saka Paradraya ("Saka beyond the sea", the Persian term for all Scythian peoples to the north of the Caspian and Black Seas); the Skudra themselves (most likely the Thracian tribes), and Yauna Takabara. The latter term, which translates as "Ionians with shield-like hats", is believed to refer to Macedonians. The three ethnicities (Saka, Macedonian, Thracian) enrolled in the Achaemenid army, as shown in the Imperial tomb reliefs of Naqsh-e Rostam, and participated in the Second Persian invasion of Greece on the Achaemenid side.

When Achaemenid control over its European possessions collapsed once the Ionian Revolt started, the Thracians did not help the Greek rebels, and they instead saw Achaemenid rule as more favourable because the latter had treated the Thracians with favour and even given them more land, and also because they realised that Achaemenid rule was a bulwark against Greek expansion and Scythian attacks. During the revolt, Aristagoras of Miletus captured Myrcinus from the Edones and died trying to attack another Thracian city.

Once the Ionian Revolt had been fully quelled, the Achaemenid general Mardonius crossed the Hellespont with a large fleet and army, re-subjugated Thrace without any effort and made Macedonia full part of the satrapy of Skudra. Mardonius was however attacked at night by the Bryges in the area of Lake Doiran and modern-day Valandovo, but he was able to defeat and submit them as well. Herodotus's list of tribes who provided the Achaemenid army with soldiers included Thracians from both the coast and from the central Thracian plain, attesting that Mardonius's campaign had reconquered all the Thracian areas which were under Achaemenid rule before the Ionian Revolt.

When the Greeks defeated a second invasion attempt by the Persian Empire in 479 BCE, they started attacking the satrapy of Skudra, which was resisted by both the Thracians and the Persian forces. The Thracians kept on sending supplies to the governor of Eion when the Greeks besieged it. When the city fell to the Greeks in 475 BCE, Cimon gave its land to Athens for colonisation. Although Athens was now in control of the Aegean Sea and the Hellespont following the defeat of the Persian invasion, the Persians were still able to control the southern coast of Thrace from a base in central Thrace and with the support of the Thracians. Thanks to the Thracians co-operating with the Persians by sending supplies and military reinforcements down the Hebrus river route, Achaemenid authority in central Thrace lasted until around 465 BCE, and the governor Mascames managed to resist many Greek attacks in Doriscus until then. Around this time, Teres I, the king of the Odrysae tribe, in whose territory the Hebrus flowed, was starting to organise the rise of his kingdom into a powerful state.

With the end of Achaemenid power in the Balkans, the Thracian Odrysian kingdom, the kingdom of Macedonia, and the Athenian thalassocracy filled the ensuing power vacuum and formed their own spheres of influence in the area.

== See also ==
- Scythian campaign of Darius I
- Achaemenid Macedonia
- Doriscus
- Eion
- Boryza (city)
- Ionia (satrapy)
- Kausia
- Skydra

== Sources ==
- Bukharin, Mikhail Dmitrievich [in Russian] (2013). "Колаксай и его братья (античная традиция о происхождении царской власти у скифов" [Kolaxais and his Brothers (Classical Tradition on the Origin of the Royal Power of the Scythians)]. Аристей: вестник классической филологии и античной истории (in Russian). 8: 20–80.
- Cook, J. M. (1985). "The Rise of the Achaemenids and Establishment of Their Empire". In Gershevitch, Ilya (ed.). The Cambridge History of Iran. Vol. 2. Cambridge, United Kingdom: Cambridge University Press. ISBN 978-0-521-20091-2.
- Dandamayev, M. A. (1994). "Media and Achaemenid Iran". In Dani, Ahmad Hasan; Harmatta, János; Puri, Baij Nath; Etemadi, G. F.; Bosworth, Clifford Edmund (eds.). The Development of Sedentary and Nomadic Civilizations: 700 B.C. to A.D. 250. History of Civilizations of Central Asia. Vol. 2. Paris, France: UNESCO. pp. 35–64. ISBN 978-9-231-02846-5.
- Hammond, N. G. L. (1980). "The Extent of Persian Occupation in Thrace". Chiron: Mitteilungen der Kommission für Alte Geschichte und Epigraphik des Deutschen Archäologischen Instituts [Chiron: Bulletin of the Commission for Ancient History and Epigraphy of the German Archaeological Institute]. 10: 53–61.
- Hammond, N. G. L.; Fol, Alexander (1988). "Persia in Europe, apart from Greece". Persia, Greece and the Western Mediterranean, c. 525 to 479 B.C. The Cambridge Ancient History. Vol. 4. Cambridge University Press. pp. 246–253. ISBN 978-0-521-22804-6.
- Shahbazi, A. Shapur (1994). "3". Darius. Encyclopædia Iranica. New York City, United States: Encyclopædia Iranica Foundation; Brill Publishers.
- Szemerényi, Oswald (1980). Four old Iranian ethnic names: Scythian – Skudra – Sogdian – Saka (PDF). Verlag der Österreichischen Akademie der Wissenschaften. ISBN 978-3-700-10367-7.
