= Maciya =

Maciya one of the Pontic peoples mentioned by Darius and Xerxes. Maciya is probably Macron in southern Balochistan.

== Etymology ==
Machiya comes from the Old Persian place name Maka(probably corresponds to the Gedrosia of ancient authors), which literally means "living or dwelling by the sea."

== History ==
Inscription of King Darius I: “I am Darius, the great king, the king of kings, the king of multi-tribal countries ... By the will of Ahuramazda, these are the countries that I had to rule, except for Persia: ... Media, Elam, Parthia, Areia, Bactria, Sogdiana, Khorezm, Drangiana, Arachosia, Sattagidia, Gaidara, India, scythians haumavarga, scythians with pointed hats, Babylon, Assyria, Arabia, Egypt, Armenia, Cappadocia, Lydia, Ionia, scythians across the sea, Skudra, Ionians wearing helmets, Putia, Kushia (Ethiopia), Maciya, Karka ".

Maciya is also called a people living beyond the sea.
