= Doriscus =

Ancient Thracian city

Coordinates: 40°52′25″N 26°09′50″E

Location of ancient Doriscus in modern Greece.

Doriscus appears on the northern shore of the Aegean Sea.

Doriscus (Ancient Greek: Δορίσκος and Δωρίσκος, Dorískos) was a settlement in ancient Thrace (modern-day Greece), on the northern shores of Aegean Sea, in a plain west of the river Hebrus. It was notable for remaining in Persian hands for many years after the Second Persian invasion of Greece, and remained thus known as the last Persian stronghold in Europe.

Doriscus was founded by Darius the Great in 512 BC. He built a Royal Fortress and stationed a large number of Persian troops there at the time of his Scythian campaign.

Herodotus (7.59) reports that Doriscus was the first place Xerxes the Great stopped to review his troops after crossing the Hellespont in 480 BC, during the Second Persian invasion of Greece. Herodotus also writes that Xerxes I of Persia made Mascames, son of Megadostes, governor of Doriscus in order to replace the man Darius I had appointed.

Doriscus is notable as it was one of the few Persian towns in the Balkans that remained under the Persian sway, even after the Second Persian invasion of Greece. The Athenian general Cimon that led the conquests after the Persian retreat was unable to capture it. Herodotus states that Doriscus "was never taken" from the Persians. Its governor Mascames was honored by the Persian king for his defence.

According to Raphael Sealey, the Achaemenid ruler probably recalled Mascames with his garrison around 465 BC, and finally abandoned Doriscus. However, Muhammad Dandamayev notes that when Herodotus wrote his Histories in the second half of the fifth century BC, Doriscus was still held by the Persians.

Doriscus' site is located at the modern village of Doriskos, Eastern Macedonia and Thrace, Greece.

== See also ==
- Eion
- Boryza (city)

== Sources ==
- Dandamaev, M. A. (1989). A Political History of the Achaemenid Empire. BRILL. ISBN 978-9004091726.
- Kuhrt, Amélie (2007). The Persian Empire: A Corpus of Sources from the Achaemenid Period. Routledge. ISBN 978-0415552790.
