= Mascames =

5th-century BC Persian official and military commander

Mascames was appointed Governor of Doriscus by Xerxes I.

Mascames, also spelled Maskames (Old Persian: Maškāma) was a Persian official and military commander, who flourished during the reign of Xerxes I (r. 486–465). He was the son of Megadostes, and was appointed governor of Doriscus in 480 BC by Xerxes I, succeeding the governor who had been appointed by Darius the Great (r. 522–486 BC). According to Herodotus, Mascames resisted all Greek attacks following the Second Persian invasion of Greece, and remained thus known as the only remaining Persian governor in Europe. Though the Greeks managed to clear other Persian garrisons in Europe, such as Eion, they were unable to take Doriscus from Mascames, which irked the Athenian military.

As no one managed to dislodge him, Mascames was highly honored by Xerxes I and received annual gifts from him for his bravery. Mascames's descendants (who succeeded him) continued to receive gifts from Xerxes I's successor, Artaxerxes I (r. 465–424 BC).

According to Raphael Sealey, the Achaemenid ruler probably recalled Mascames with his garrison around 465 BC, and finally abandoned Doriscus. However, Muhammad Dandamayev notes that when Herodotus wrote his Histories in the second half of the fifth century BC, Doriscus was still held by the Persians.

Miroslav Ivanov Vasilev states that Mascames may have died by 465 BC. (Note: Vasilev: "it appears that during the reign of Artaxerxes, who came to the throne in 465, Mascames was no longer alive, since, according to Herodotus, the new Persian king sent gifts to his successors".)

== Sources ==
- Dandamaev, M. A. (1989). A Political History of the Achaemenid Empire. Brill. ISBN 978-9004091726.
- Kuhrt, Amélie (2007). The Persian Empire: A Corpus of Sources from the Achaemenid Period. Routledge. ISBN 978-0415552790.
- Vasilev, Miroslav Ivanov (2015). The Policy of Darius and Xerxes towards Thrace and Macedonia. Brill. ISBN 978-9004282155.
- Waters, Matt (2014). Ancient Persia: A Concise History of the Achaemenid Empire, 550–330 BCE. Cambridge University Press. ISBN 978-1107652729.
