= Second Persian invasion of Greece =

480–479 BC phase of the Greco-Persian Wars

- Part of the Greco-Persian Wars
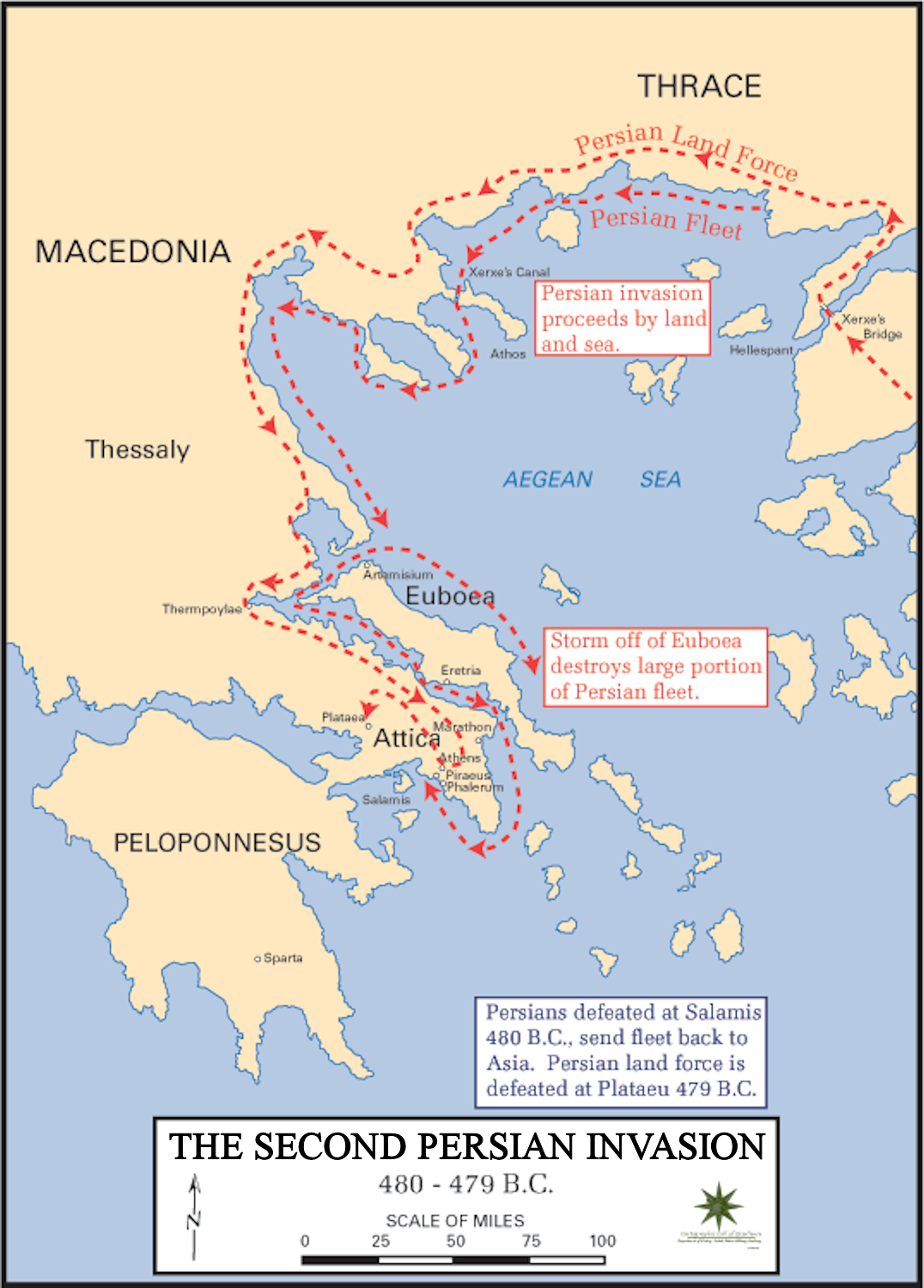
Date	480–479 BC
Location	Greece
Result	Greek victory

Belligerents
Sparta; Athens; Corinth; Megara; Tegea; Aegina; Other Greek city-states	Achaemenid Empire

Commanders and leaders
Leonidas I †; Themistocles; Pausanias; Leotychidas II; Eurybiades; Aristides; Xanthippus (father of Pericles)	Xerxes I Mardonius †; Hydarnes

Strength
Land forces: 10,000 Spartans; 9,000 Athenians; 5,000 Corinthians; 2,000 Thespians; 1,000 Phocians; 30,000 Greeks from other city-states, including Arcadia, Aegina, Eretria, and Plataea Sea forces: 400 triremes 6,000 marines 68,000 oarsmen Total: 131,000 men 400 ships	Land forces: 80,000–100,000 soldiers or less (modern estimates) Sea forces: 600–1,200 ships (modern estimates); Total: 200,000; 300,000–500,000 (modern estimates) 5,283,220 (ancient sources)

The second Persian invasion of Greece (480–479 BC) occurred during the Greco-Persian Wars, as King Xerxes I of Persia sought to conquer all of Greece. The invasion was a direct, if delayed, response to the defeat of the first Persian invasion of Greece (492–490 BC) at the Battle of Marathon, which ended Darius I's attempts to subjugate Greece. After Darius's death, his son Xerxes spent several years planning for the second invasion, mustering an enormous army and navy. The Athenians and Spartans led the Greek resistance. About a tenth of the Greek city-states joined the 'Allied' effort; most remained neutral or submitted to Xerxes.

The invasion began in spring 480 BC, when the Persian army crossed the Hellespont and marched through Thrace and Macedonia to Thessaly. The Persian advance was blocked at the pass of Thermopylae by a small Allied force under King Leonidas I of Sparta; simultaneously, the Persian fleet was blocked by an Allied fleet at the straits of Artemisium. At the famous Battle of Thermopylae, the Allied army held back the Persian army for three days, before they were outflanked by a mountain path and the Allied rearguard was trapped and annihilated. The Allied fleet had also withstood two days of Persian attacks at the Battle of Artemisium, but when news reached them of the disaster at Thermopylae, they withdrew to Salamis.

After Thermopylae, all of Euboea, Phocis, Boeotia and Attica fell to the Persian army, which captured and burnt Athens. However, a larger Allied army fortified the narrow Isthmus of Corinth, protecting the Peloponnesus from Persian conquest. Both sides thus sought a naval victory that might decisively alter the course of the war. The Athenian general Themistocles succeeded in luring the Persian navy into the narrow Straits of Salamis, where the huge number of Persian ships became disorganised, and were soundly beaten by the Allied fleet. The Allied victory at Salamis prevented a quick conclusion to the invasion, and fearing becoming trapped in Europe, Xerxes retreated to Asia leaving his general Mardonius to finish the conquest with the elite of the army.

The following spring, the Allies formed the largest hoplite army ever assembled and marched north from the Isthmus to confront Mardonius. At the ensuing Battle of Plataea, the Greek infantry again proved its superiority, inflicting a severe defeat on the Persians and killing Mardonius in the process. On the same day, across the Aegean Sea an Allied navy destroyed the remnants of the Persian navy at the Battle of Mycale. With this double defeat, the invasion was ended, and Persian power in the Aegean severely dented. The Greeks under the Delian League would now move to the offensive, eventually expelling the Persians from Greece, the Aegean Islands and Ionia. The wider conflict came to an end in 449 BC with the Peace of Callias.

== Sources ==
The main source for the Great Greco-Persian Wars is the Greek historian Herodotus. Herodotus, who has been called the "Father of History", was born in 484 BC in Halicarnassus, Asia Minor (then under Persian overlordship). He wrote his 'Enquiries' (Greek—Historia; English—(The) Histories) around 440–430 BC, trying to trace the origins of the Greco-Persian Wars, which would still have been relatively recent history (the wars finally ending in 450 BC). Herodotus's approach was entirely novel, and at least in Western society, he does seem to have invented "history" as we know it. As Holland has it: "For the first time, a chronicler set himself to trace the origins of a conflict not to a past so remote so as to be utterly fabulous, nor to the whims and wishes of some god, nor to a people's claim to manifest destiny, but rather explanations he could verify personally."

Some subsequent ancient historians, despite following in his footsteps, criticised Herodotus, starting with Thucydides. Nevertheless, Thucydides chose to begin his history where Herodotus left off (at the Siege of Sestos), and therefore evidently felt that Herodotus's history was accurate enough not to need re-writing or correcting. Plutarch criticised Herodotus in his essay "On The Malignity of Herodotus", describing Herodotus as Philobarbaros (barbarian-lover), for not being pro-Greek enough, which suggests that Herodotus might actually have done a reasonable job of being even-handed. A negative view of Herodotus was passed on to Renaissance Europe, though he remained well read. However, since the 19th century his reputation has been dramatically rehabilitated by archaeological finds that have repeatedly confirmed his version of events. The prevailing modern view is that Herodotus generally did a remarkable job in his Historia, but that some of his specific details (particularly troop numbers and dates) should be viewed with skepticism. Nevertheless, there are still some historians who believe Herodotus made up much of his story.

The Greek historian Diodorus Siculus from Sicily, writing in the 1st century BC in his Bibliotheca Historica, also provides an account of the Greco-Persian wars, partially derived from the earlier Greek historian Ephorus. This account is fairly consistent with Herodotus's. The Greco-Persian wars are also described in less detail by a number of other ancient historians including Plutarch, Ctesias, and are alluded by other authors, such as the playwright Aeschylus. Archaeological evidence, such as the Serpent Column, also supports some of Herodotus's specific claims.

== Background ==
A map showing the Greek world at the time of the invasion

The Greek city-states of Athens and Eretria had supported the unsuccessful Ionian Revolt against the Persian Empire of Darius I in 499–494 BC. The Persian Empire was still relatively young and prone to revolts among its subject peoples. Moreover, Darius was a usurper and had spent considerable time extinguishing revolts against his rule. The Ionian revolt threatened the integrity of his empire, and Darius thus vowed to punish those involved (especially those not already part of the empire). Darius also saw the opportunity to expand his empire into the fractious world of Ancient Greece. A preliminary expedition under Mardonius, in 492 BC, to secure the land approaches to Greece ended with the re-conquest of Thrace and forced Macedon to become a fully subordinate kingdom part of Persia. It had previously been a vassal as early as the late 6th century BC, but remained having autonomy and was not fully subordinate yet.

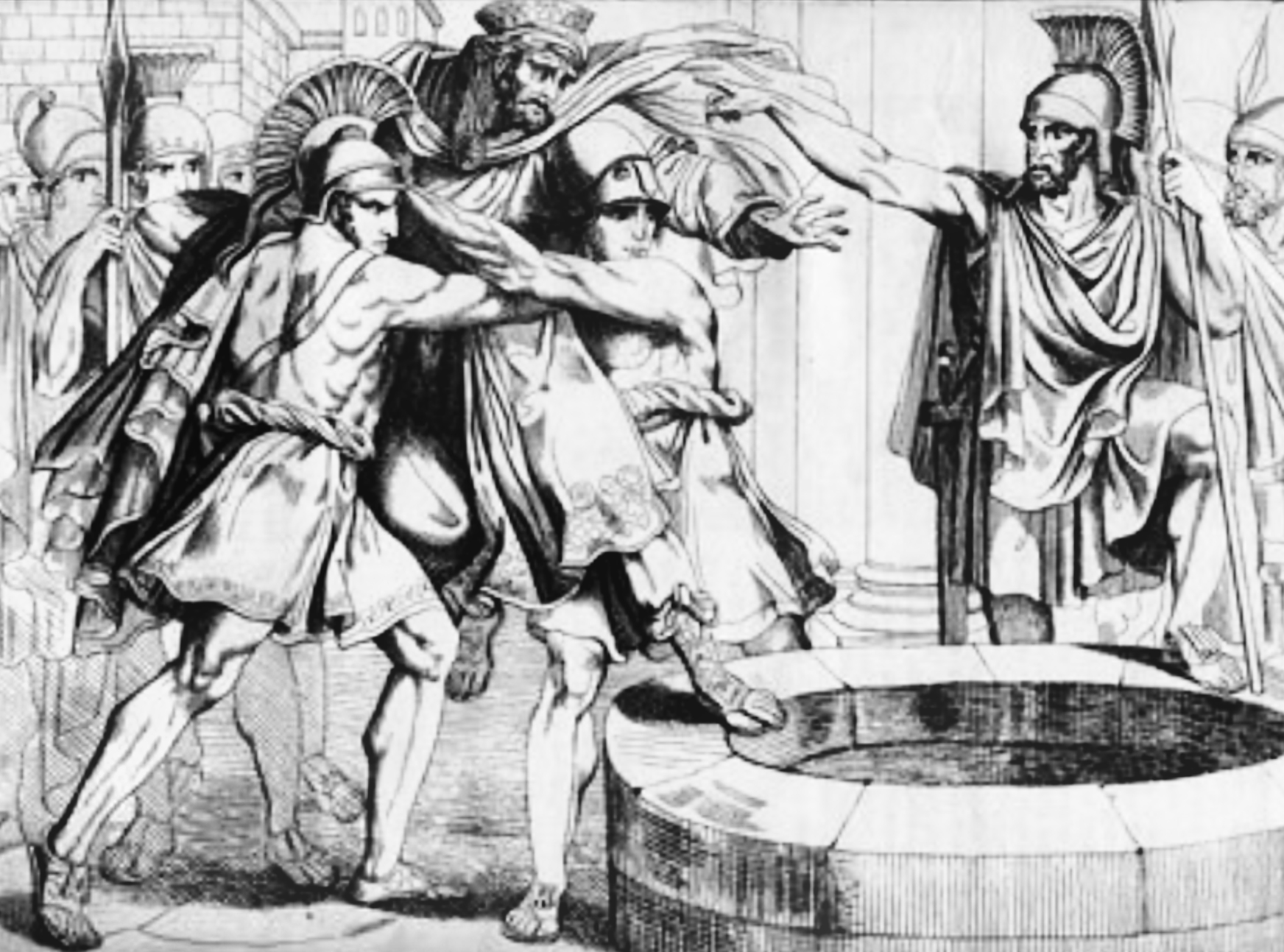
The Spartans throw Persian envoys into a well.

In 491 BC, Darius sent emissaries to all the Greek city-states, asking for a gift of "earth and water" in token of their submission to him. Having had a demonstration of his power the previous year, the majority of Greek cities duly obliged. In Athens, however, the ambassadors were put on trial and then executed; in Sparta, they were simply thrown down a well. This meant that Sparta was also now effectively at war with Persia. (Later, in order to appease Xerxes, who was about to launch the Second Persian invasion of Greece after succeeding his father, Darius, two Spartans were voluntarily sent to Susa for execution, in atonement for the death of the Persian heralds sent earlier by Darius.)

Darius thus put together an ambitious task force under Datis and Artaphernes in 490 BC, which attacked Naxos, before receiving the submission of the other Cycladic Islands. The task force then moved on Eretria, which it besieged and destroyed. Finally, it moved to attack Athens, landing at the bay of Marathon, where it was met by a heavily outnumbered Athenian army. At the ensuing Battle of Marathon, the Athenians won a remarkable victory, which resulted in the withdrawal of the Persian army to Asia.

Darius therefore began raising a huge new army with which he meant to completely subjugate Greece; however, in 486 BC, his Egyptian subjects revolted, indefinitely postponing any Greek expedition. Darius then died while preparing to march on Egypt, and the throne of Persia passed to his son Xerxes I. Xerxes crushed the Egyptian revolt, and very quickly restarted the preparations for the invasion of Greece.

== Persian preparations ==
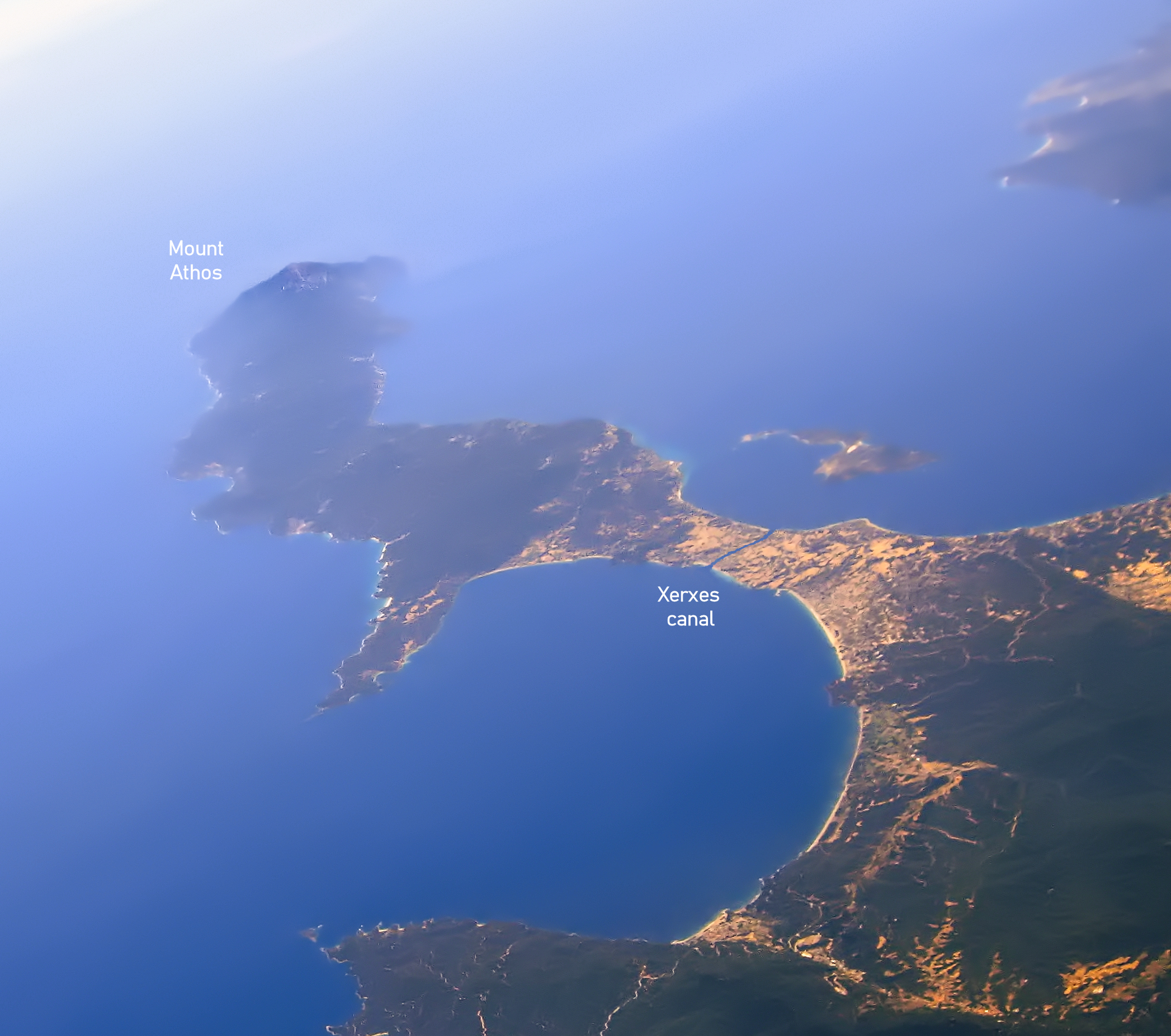
Rendition of the Xerxes Canal (seen from north), built over 3 years from 483 BC across the Mount Athos peninsula. It is now filled-up.

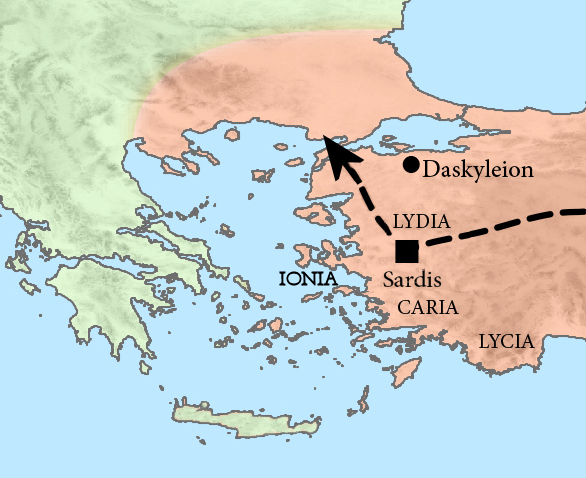
Preparations of the army of Xerxes, with quarters in Sardis in 481–480 BC, and crossing of the Hellespont at Abydos.

Since this was to be a full-scale invasion, it required long-term planning, stock-piling and conscription. It was decided that Xerxes' Pontoon Bridges were to be set up to allow his army to cross the Hellespont to Europe, and that a canal should be dug across the isthmus of Mount Athos (rounding which headland, a Persian fleet had been destroyed in 492 BC). These were both feats of exceptional ambition, which would have been beyond any contemporary state. However, the campaign was delayed one year because of another revolt in Egypt and Babylonia.

In 481 BC, after roughly four years of preparation, Xerxes began to muster the troops for the invasion of Europe. Herodotus gives the names of 46 nations from which troops were drafted. The Persian army was gathered in Asia Minor in the summer and autumn of 481 BC. The armies from the Eastern satrapies was gathered in Kritala, Cappadocia and were led by Xerxes to Sardis where they passed the winter. Early in spring it moved to Abydos where it was joined with the armies of the western satrapies. Then the army that Xerxes had mustered marched towards Europe, crossing the Hellespont on two pontoon bridges.

=== Size of the Persian forces ===
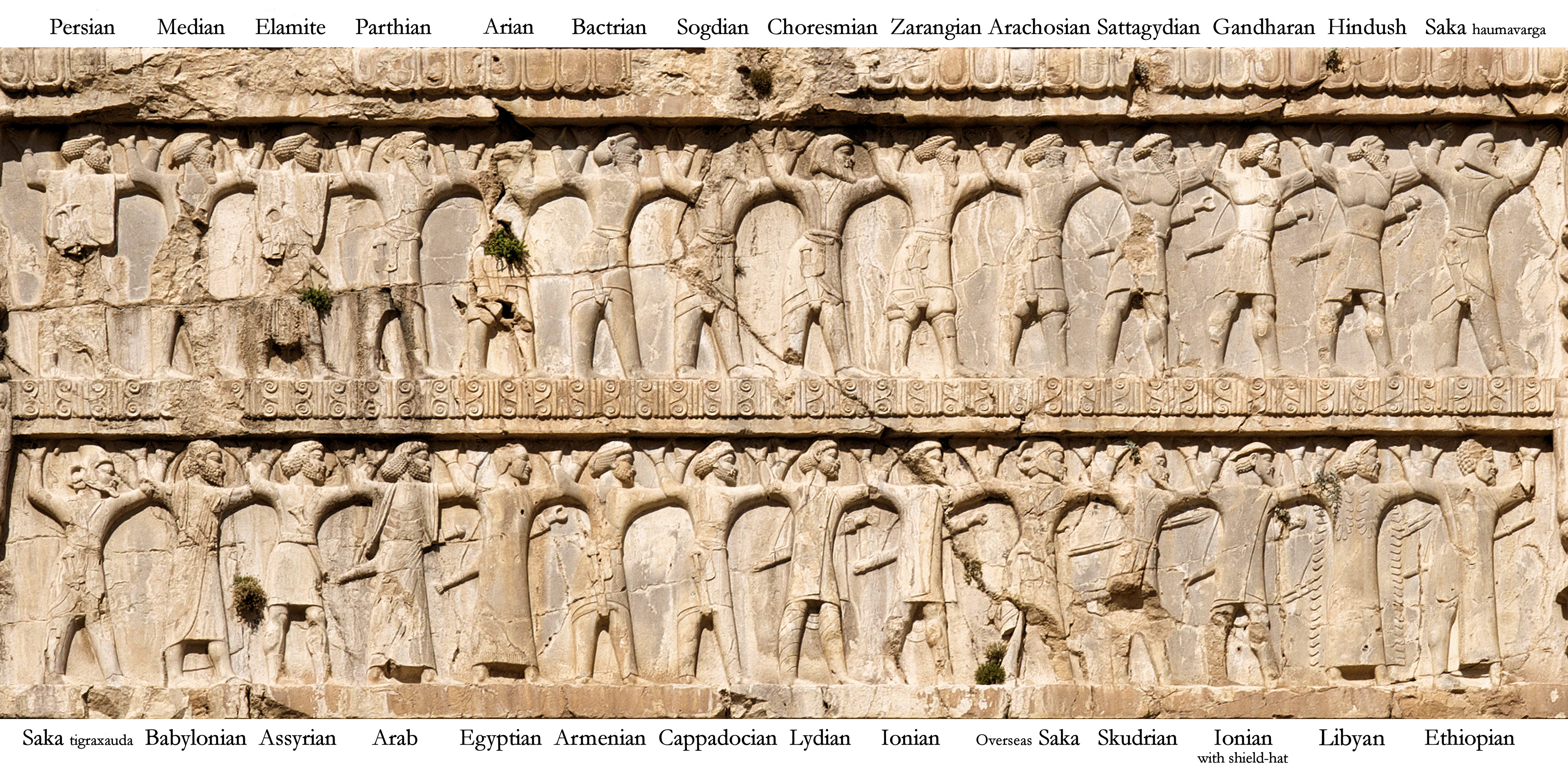
The soldiers of Xerxes I, of all ethnicities, on the tomb of Xerxes I, at Naqsh-e Rostam.

The numbers of troops that Xerxes mustered for the second invasion of Greece have been the subject of endless dispute because the numbers given in ancient sources are very large indeed. Herodotus claimed that there were, in total, 2.5 million military personnel, accompanied by an equivalent number of support personnel. The poet Simonides, who was a contemporary, talks of four million; Ctesias, based on Persian records, gave 800,000 as the total number of the army (without the support personnel) that was assembled by Xerxes. While it has been suggested that Herodotus or his sources had access to official Persian Empire records of the forces involved in the expedition, modern scholars tend to reject these figures based on knowledge of the Persian military systems, their logistical capabilities, the Greek countryside, and supplies available along the army's route.

Modern scholars thus generally attribute the numbers given in the ancient sources to the result of miscalculations or exaggerations on the part of the victors, or disinformation by the Persians in the run up to the war. The topic has been hotly debated but the modern consensus revolves around the figure of 200,000 or 300,000–500,000. Nevertheless, whatever the real numbers were, it is clear that Xerxes was eager to ensure a successful expedition by mustering overwhelming numerical superiority by land and by sea, and also that much of the army died of starvation and disease, never returning to Asia.

Herodotus tells us that the army and navy, while moving through Thrace, was halted at Doriskos for an inspection by Xerxes, and he recounts the numbers of troops found to be present:

Units	Numbers
1,207 triremes with 200-man crews from 12 ethnic groups: Phoenicians along with the "Syrians of Palestine" (likely Judeans), Egyptians, Cyprians, Cilicians, Pamphylians, Lycians, Dorians of Asia, Carians, Ionians, Aegean islanders, Aeolians, Greeks from Pontus	241,400
30 marines per trireme (Note: The 30 marines are in addition to the figure of 200 given for the ships' crews.)from the Persians, Medes or Sacae	36,210
3,000 Galleys, including 50-oar penteconters (80-man crew), 30-oared ships, light galleys and heavy horse-transports (Note: There is some contradiction in Herodotus's accounts. The figure of 240,000 is derived from 3,000 penteconters)	240,000^{b}
Total of ships' complements	517,610
Infantry from 47 ethnic groups, (Note: The 47th ethnic group is missing from Herodotus's text.) including Medes, Cissians, Hyrcanians, Assyrians, Chaldeans, Bactrians, Sacae, Indians, Arians, Parthians, Chorasmians, Sogdians, Gandarians, Dadicae, Caspians, Sarangae, Pactyes, Utians, Mycians, Paricanians, Arabians, Ethiopians of Africa, Ethiopians of Baluchistan, Libyans, Paphlagonians, Ligyes, Matieni, Mariandyni, Cappadocians, Phrygians, Armenians, Lydians, Mysians, Asian Thracians, Lasonii, Milyae, Moschi, Tibareni, Macrones, Mossynoeci, Mares, Colchians, Alarodians, Saspirians and Red Sea islanders.	1,700,000
Horse cavalry from the Persians, Sagartians, Medes, Cissians, Indians, Caspians and Paricanians.	80,000
Arab camel troops and Libyan charioteers	20,000
Total Asian land and sea forces (Note: The term "Asian" is Herodotus' but under that term he also includes Arabians and north Africans.)	2,317,610
120 triremes with 200-man crews from the Greeks of Thrace and the islands near it.	24,000
Balkan infantry from 13 ethnic groups: European Thracians, Paeonians, Eordi, Bottiaei, Chalcidians, Brygians, Pierians, Macedonians, Perrhaebi, Enienes, Dolopes, Magnesians, Achaeans	300,000
Grand total	2,641,610

Herodotus doubles this number to account for support personnel and thus he reports that the whole army numbered 5,283,220 men. Other ancient sources give similarly large numbers. The poet Simonides, who was a near-contemporary, talks of four million; Ctesias gave 800,000 as the total number of the army that assembled in Doriskos.

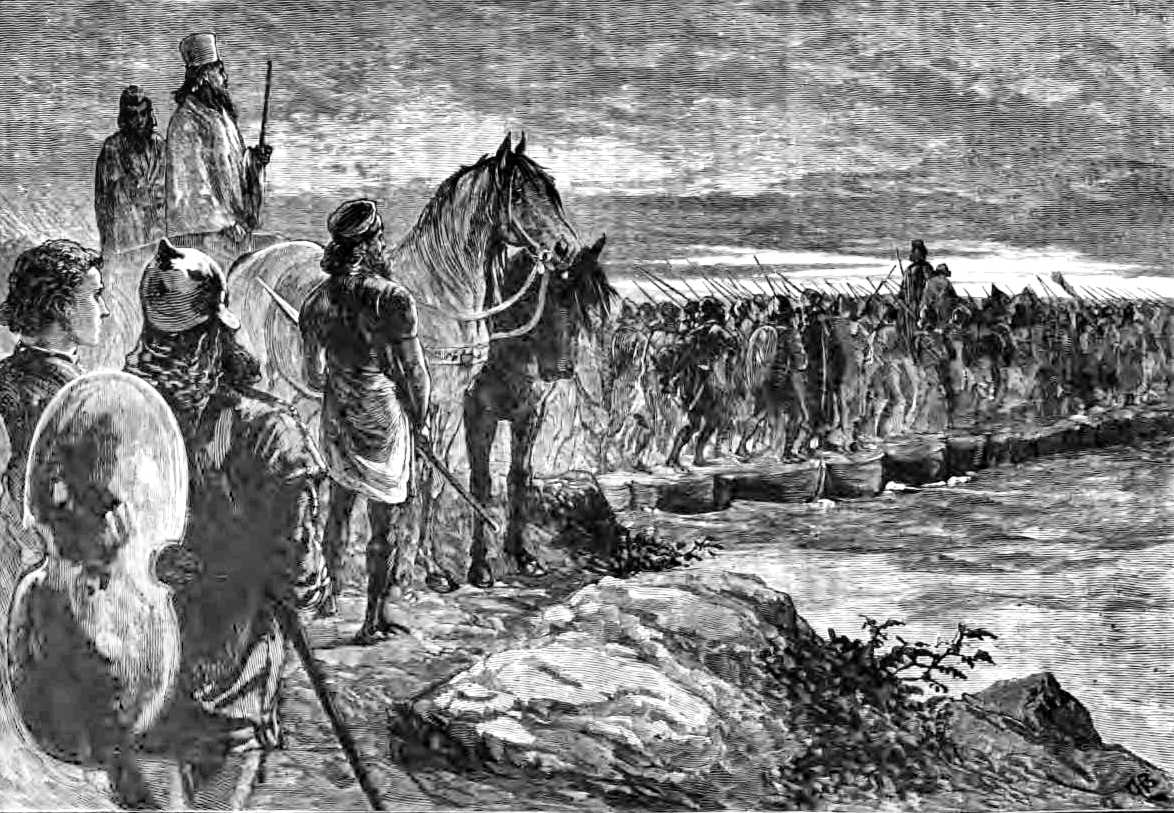
Crossing the Hellespont by Xerxes with his huge army

An early and very influential modern historian, George Grote, set the tone by expressing incredulity at the numbers given by Herodotus: "To admit this overwhelming total, or anything near to it, is obviously impossible." Grote's main objection is the supply problem, though he does not analyse the problem in detail. He did not reject Herodotus's account altogether, citing the latter's reporting of the Persians' careful methods of accounting and their stockpiling of supply caches for three years, but drew attention to the contradictions in the ancient sources. A later influential historian, J. B. Bury, calls Herodotus's numbers "wholly fabulous" and judges that the Persian land forces may have been 180,000. A major limiting factor for the size of the Persian army, first suggested by Sir Frederick Maurice (a British transport officer) is the supply of water. Maurice suggested in the region of 200,000 men and 70,000 animals could have been supported by the rivers in that region of Greece. He further suggested that Herodotus may have confused the Persian terms for chiliarchy (1,000) and myriarchy (10,000), leading to an exaggeration by a factor of ten. Other early modern scholars estimated that the land forces participating in the invasion at 100,000 soldiers or less, based on the logistical systems available to the Ancients.

Munro and Macan note Herodotus giving the names of six major commanders and 29 myriarchs (leaders of a baivabaram, the basic unit of the Persian infantry, which numbered about 10,000-strong); this would give a land force of roughly 300,000 men. Other proponents of larger numbers suggest figures from 250,000 to 700,000.

==== Fleet ====
The size of the Persian fleet is also disputed, though perhaps less so. According to Herodotus the Persian fleet numbered 1,207 triremes and 3,000 transport and supply ships, including 50-oared galleys (Penteconters) (πεντηκοντήρ). Tetramnestos, King of Sidon, served as the chief advisor of Xerxes in naval matters. In effect, the Sidon fleet held a position of primacy among the naval forces of the Achaemenid Empire at that time, providing the best ships in the fleet, even before the fleet of Artemisia of Halicarnassus or the Egyptians. The Phoenicians furnished a fleet of 300 ships, "together with the Syrians of Palestine".

Herodotus gives a detailed breakdown of the Persian triremes by nationality:

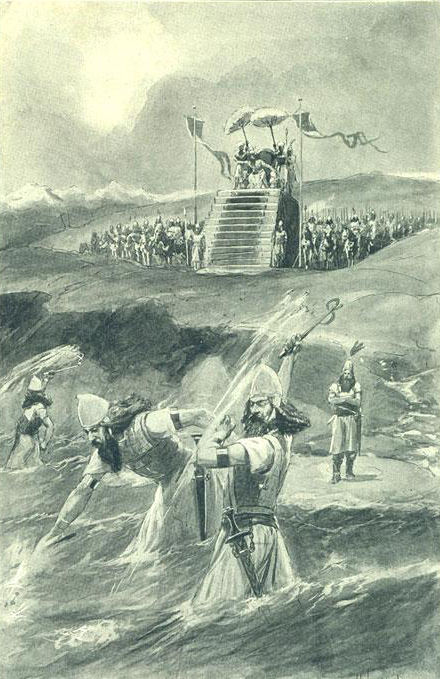
Xerxes attending the lashing and "chaining" of the Hellespont (Illustration from 1909)

Region		Region		Region	Number of ships
Phoenicia and Syria	300	Egypt	200	Cyprus	150
Cilicia	100	Ionia	100	Pontus	100
Caria	70	Aeolia	60	Lycia	50
Pamphylia	30	Dorians from Asia Minor	30	Cyclades	17
				Total	1207

Herodotus also records that this was the number at the Battle of Salamis, despite the losses earlier in storms off Sepia and Euboea, and at the battle of Artemisium. He claims that the losses were replenished with reinforcements, though he only records 120 triremes from the Greeks of Thrace and an unspecified number of ships from the Greek islands. Aeschylus, who fought at Salamis, also claims that he faced 1,207 warships there, of which 1,000 were triremes and 207 fast ships. Diodorus and Lysias independently claim there were 1,200 at Doriskos. The number of 1,207 (for the outset only) is also given by Ephorus, while his teacher Isocrates claims there were 1,300 at Doriskos and 1,200 at Salamis. Ctesias gives another number, 1,000 ships, while Plato, speaking in general terms refers to 1,000 ships and more.

These numbers are (by ancient standards) consistent, and this could be interpreted that a number around 1,200 is correct. Among modern scholars some have accepted this number, although suggesting that the number must have been lower by the Battle of Salamis. Other recent works on the Persian Wars reject this number—1,207 being seen as more of a reference to the combined Greek fleet in the Iliad—and generally claim that the Persians could have launched no more than around 600 warships into the Aegean.

== Hellenic alliance ==
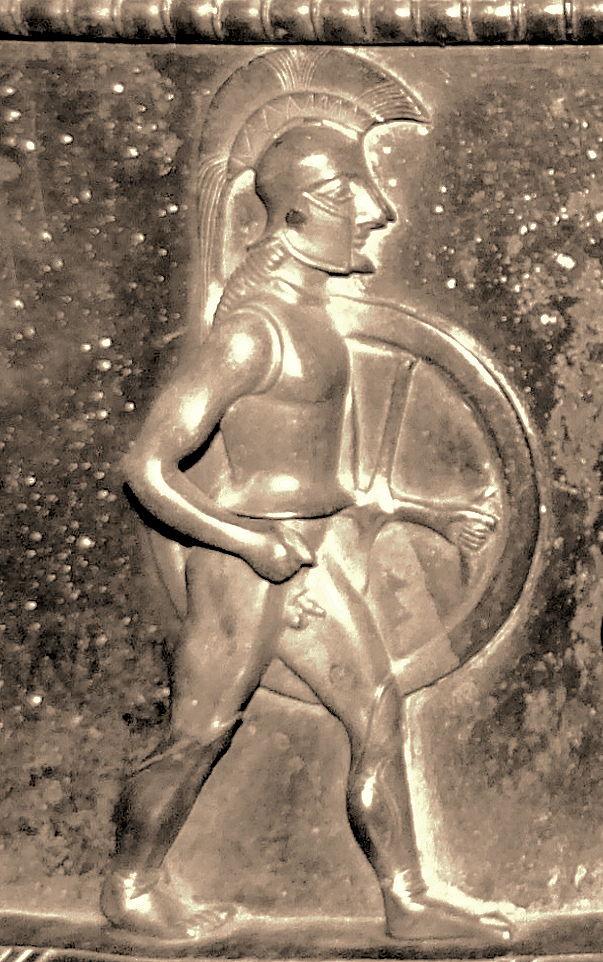
Probable Spartan Hoplite, Vix krater, c. 500 BC.

The Athenians had been preparing for war with the Persians since the mid-480s BC, and in 482 BC the decision was taken, under the guidance of the politician Themistocles, to build a massive fleet of triremes that would be necessary for the Greeks to fight the Persians. The Athenians did not have the man-power to fight on land and sea; therefore combatting the Persians would require an alliance of several Greek city states. In 481 BC Xerxes sent ambassadors around Greece asking for earth and water, but making the very deliberate omission of Athens and Sparta. Support thus began to coalesce around these two states.

A congress of states met at Corinth in late autumn of 481 BC, and a confederate alliance of Greek city-states was formed. This confederation had the power to send envoys asking for assistance and to dispatch troops from the member states to defensive points after joint consultation. Herodotus does not formulate an abstract name for the union but simply calls them "οἱ Ἕλληνες" (the Greeks) and "the Greeks who had sworn alliance" (Godley translation) or "the Greeks who had banded themselves together" (Rawlinson translation). Hereafter, they will be referred to as the 'Allies'. Sparta and Athens had a leading role in the congress but interests of all the states played a part in determining defensive strategy. Little is known about the internal workings of the congress or the discussions during its meetings. Only 70 of the approximately 700 Greek cities sent representatives. Nevertheless, this was remarkable for the disjointed Greek world, especially since many of the city-states in attendance were still technically at war with each other.

The majority of other city-states remained more-or-less neutral, awaiting the outcome of the confrontation. Thebes was a major absentee and was suspected of being willing to aid the Persians once the invasion force arrived. Not all Thebans agreed with this policy, and 400 "loyalist" hoplites joined the Allied force at Thermopylae (at least according to one possible interpretation). The most notable city actively siding with the Persians ("Medised") was Argos, in the otherwise Spartan-dominated Peloponnese. However, the Argives had been severely weakened in 494 BC, when a Spartan-force led by Cleomenes I had annihilated the Argive army in Battle of Sepeia and then massacred the fugitives.

=== Size of allied forces ===
The allies had no 'standing army', nor was there any requirement to form one; since they were fighting on home territory, they could muster armies as and when required. Different-sized allied forces thus appeared throughout the campaign. These numbers are discussed fully in the article for each battle.

== Spring 480 BC: Thrace, Macedonia and Thessaly ==
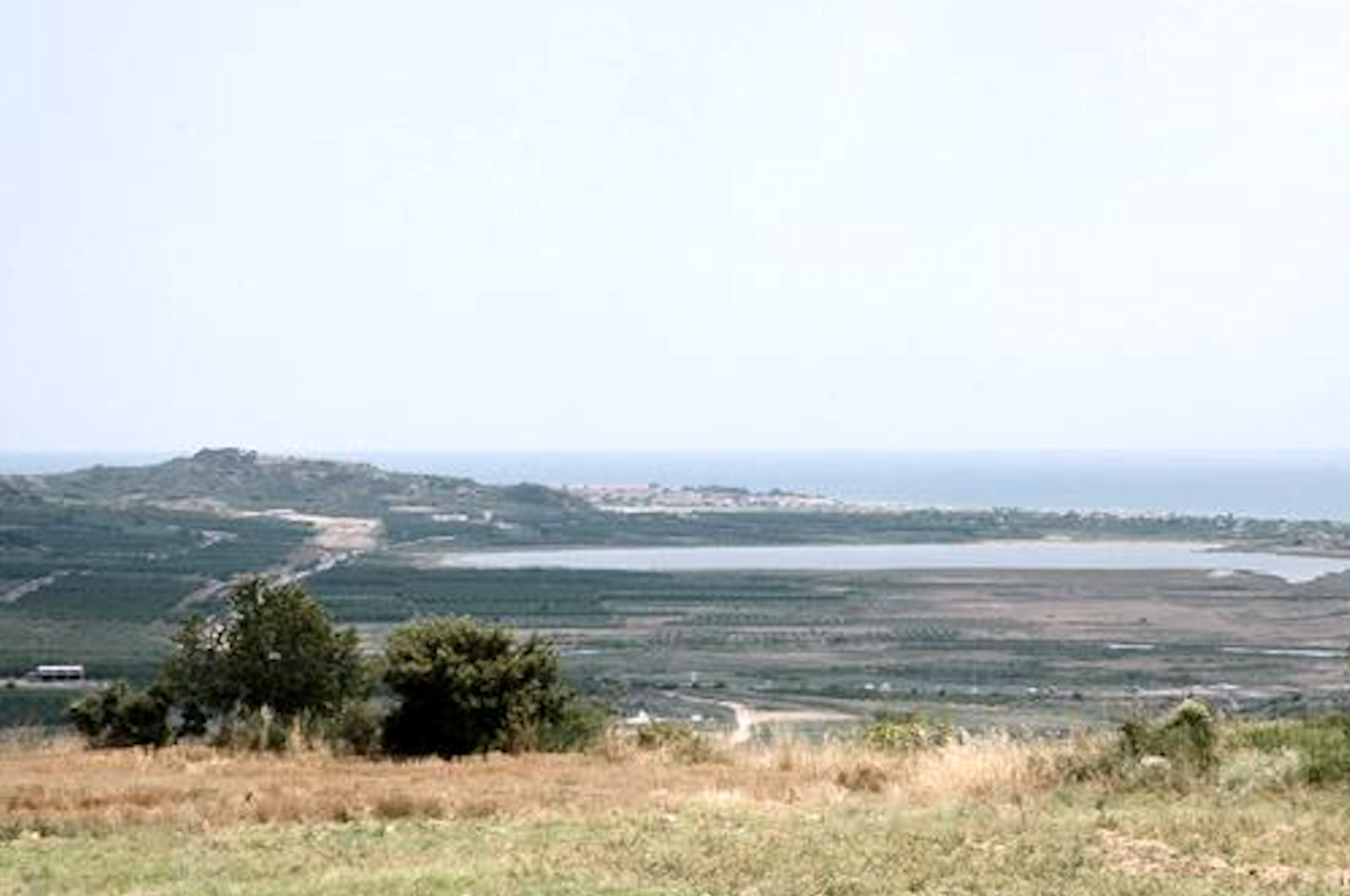
The ancient Achaemenid fort at Eion (hill to the left) and the mouth of the Strymon River (right), seen from Ennea Hodoi (Amphipolis).

Having crossed into Europe in April 480 BC, the Persian army began its march to Greece. Five major food depots had been set up along the path: at White Headland on the Thracian side of the Hellespont, at Tyrodiza in Perinthian territory, at Doriskos at the Evros river estuary where the Asian army was linked up with the Balkan allies, at Eion on the Strymon river, and at Therme, modern-day Thessaloniki. There, food had been sent from Asia for several years in preparation for the campaign. Animals had been bought and fattened, while the local populations had, for several months, been ordered to grind the grains into flour. The Persian army took roughly three months to travel unopposed from the Hellespont to Therme, a journey of about 600 km (360 mi). It paused at Doriskos where it was joined by the fleet. Xerxes reorganized the troops into tactical units replacing the national formations used earlier for the march.

The Allied 'congress' met again in the spring of 480 BC. A Thessalian delegation suggested that the allies could muster in the narrow Vale of Tempe, on the borders of Thessaly, and thereby block Xerxes's advance. A force of 10,000 Allies led by the Spartan polemarch Euenetus and Themistocles was thus dispatched to the pass. However, once there, they were warned by Alexander I of Macedon that the vale could be bypassed by at least two other passes and that the army of Xerxes was overwhelming; the Allies therefore retreated. Shortly afterwards, they received the news that Xerxes had crossed the Hellespont. The abandonment of Tempe meant that all of Thessaly submitted to the Persians, as did many cities to the north of the pass of Thermopylae when it seemed help was not forthcoming.

A second strategy was therefore suggested to the Allies by Themistocles. The route to southern Greece (Boeotia, Attica and the Peloponnesus) would require the army of Xerxes to travel through the very narrow pass of Thermopylae. This could easily be blocked by the Allies, despite the overwhelming number of Persians. Furthermore, to prevent the Persians from bypassing Thermopylae by sea, the allied navy could block the straits of Artemisium. This dual strategy was adopted by congress. However, the Peloponnesian cities made fall-back plans to defend the Isthmus of Corinth should it come to it, while the women and children of Athens were evacuated en masse to the Peloponnesian city of Troezen.

== August 480 BC: Thermopylae and Artemisium ==
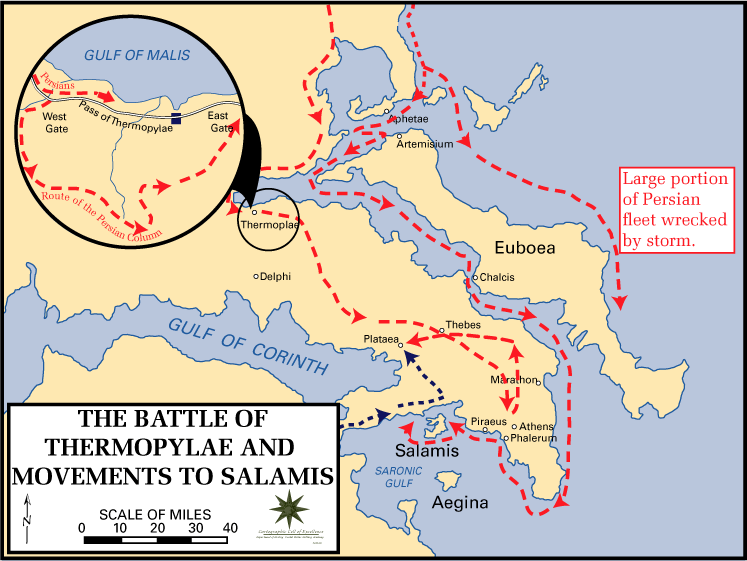
Battle of Thermopylae and movements to Salamis, 480 BC.

When the Allies received the news that Xerxes was clearing paths around Mount Olympus, and thus intending to march towards Thermopylae, it was both the period of truce that accompanied the Olympic games, and the Spartan festival of Carneia, during both of which warfare was considered sacrilegious. Nevertheless, the Spartans considered the threat so grave that they despatched their king Leonidas I with his personal bodyguard (the Hippeis) of 300 men (in this case, the elite young soldiers in the Hippeis were replaced by veterans who already had sons). Leonidas was supported by contingents from the Peloponnesian cities allied to Sparta, and other forces that were picked up en route to Thermopylae. The Allies proceeded to occupy the pass, rebuilt the wall the Phocians had built at the narrowest point of the pass and waited for Xerxes's arrival.

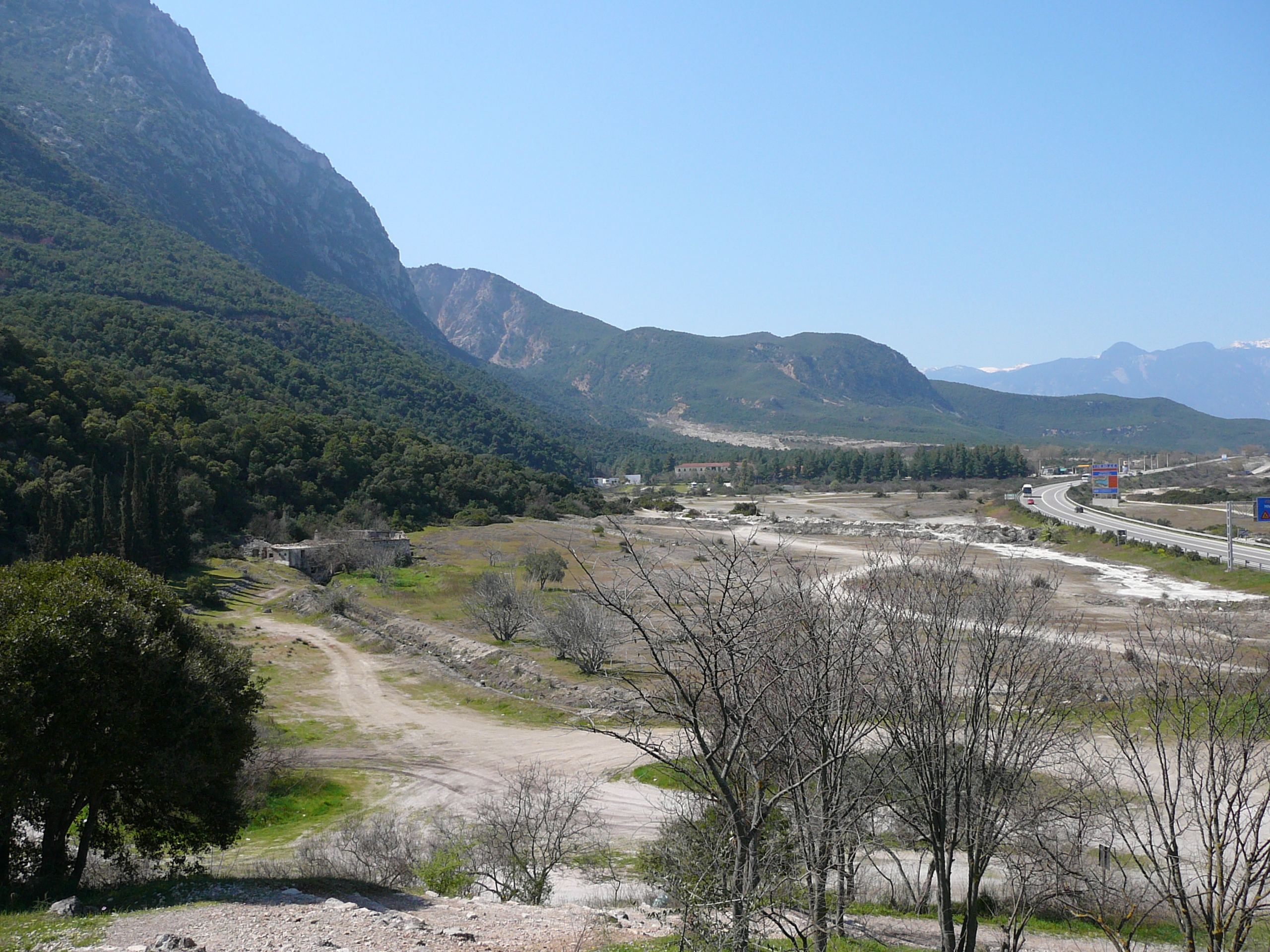
The pass of Thermopylae in modern times

When the Persians arrived at Thermopylae in mid-August, they initially waited for three days for the Allies to disperse. When Xerxes was eventually persuaded that the Allies intended to contest the pass, he sent his troops to attack. However, the Greek position was ideally suited to hoplite warfare, the Persian contingents being forced to attack the phalanx head on. The Allies thus withstood two full days of battle and everything Xerxes could throw at them. However, at the end of the second day, they were betrayed by a local resident named Ephialtes who revealed to Xerxes a mountain path that led behind the Allied lines. Xerxes then sent his elite guards, the Immortals on a night march to outflank the Allies. When he was made aware of this maneuver (while the Immortals were still en route), Leonidas dismissed the bulk of the Allied army, remaining to guard the rear with 300 Spartans, 700 Thespians, 400 Thebians and perhaps a few hundred others. On the third day of the battle, the remaining Allies sallied forth from the wall to meet the Persians and slaughter as many as they could. Ultimately, however, the Allied rearguard was annihilated, and the pass of Thermopylae opened to the Persians.

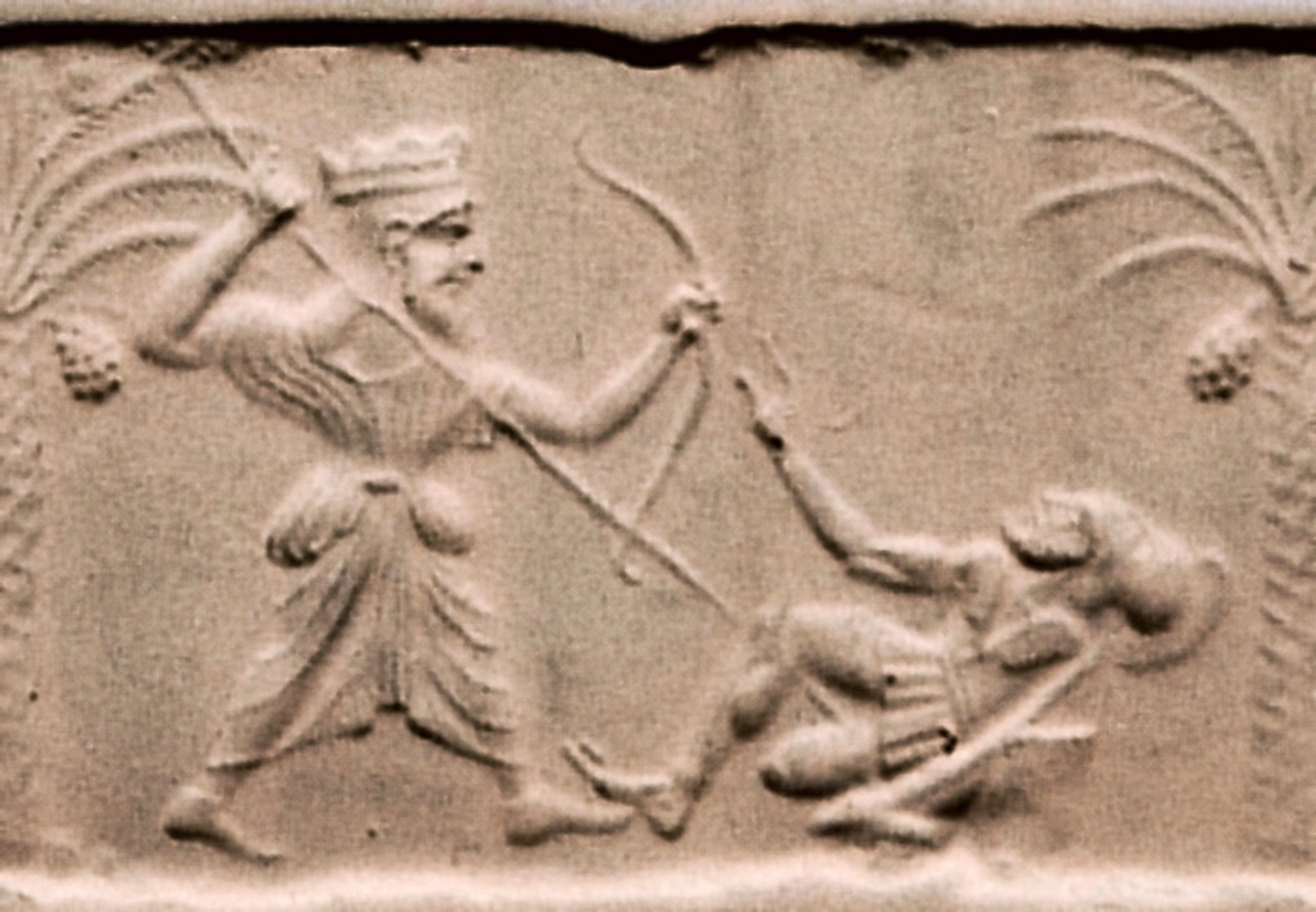
Achaemenid king killing a Greek hoplite. Circa 500 BC–475 BC, at the time of Xerxes I. Metropolitan Museum of Art.

Simultaneous with the battle at Thermopylae, an Allied naval force of 271 triremes defended the Straits of Artemisium against the Persians. Directly before Artemisium, the Persian fleet had been caught in a gale off the coast of Magnesia, losing many ships, but could still probably muster over 800 ships at the start of the battle. On the first day (also the first of the Battle of Thermopylae), the Persians detached 200 seaworthy ships, which were sent to sail around the eastern coast of Euboea. These ships were to round Euboea and block the line of retreat for the Allied fleet. Meanwhile, the Allies and the remaining Persians engaged in the late afternoon, the Allies having the better of the engagement and capturing 30 vessels. That evening, another storm occurred, wrecking the majority of the Persian detachment which had been sent around Euboea.

On the second day of the battle, news reached the Allies that their lines of retreat were no longer threatened; they therefore resolved to maintain their position. They staged a hit-and-run attack on some Cilician ships, capturing and destroying them. On the third day, however, the Persian fleet attacked the Allies lines in full force. In a day of savage fighting, the Allies held on to their position, but suffered severe losses (half the Athenian fleet was damaged); nevertheless, the Allies inflicted equal losses on the Persian fleet. That evening, the Allies received news of the fate of Leonidas and the Allies at Thermopylae. Since the Allied fleet was badly damaged, and since it no longer needed to defend the flank of Thermopylae, they retreated from Artemisium to the island of Salamis.

== September 480 BC: Destruction of Athens, Battle of Salamis ==
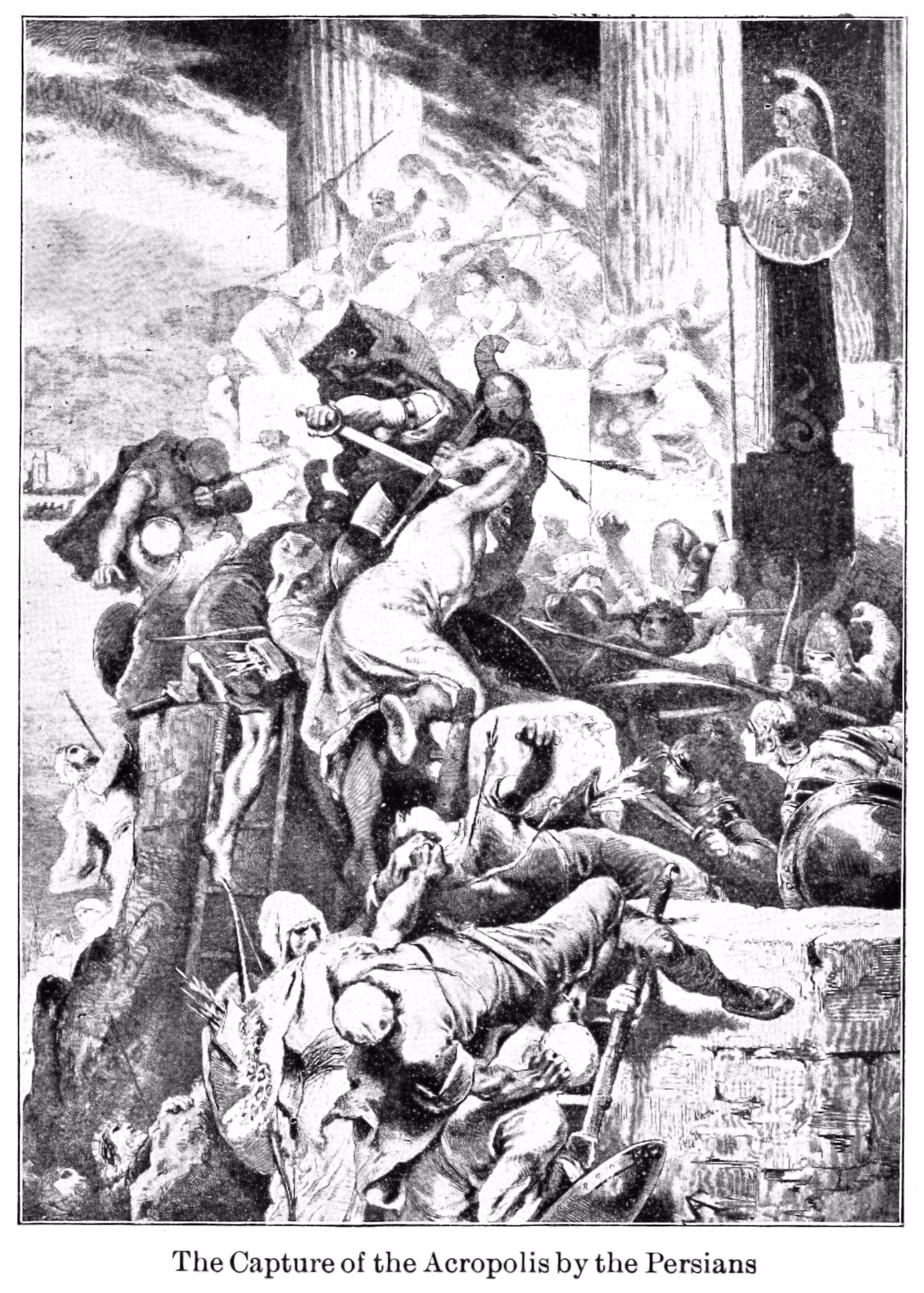
A few Athenians resisted in the Acropolis of Athens, which was stormed and burned down by the Achaemenid Army of Xerxes.

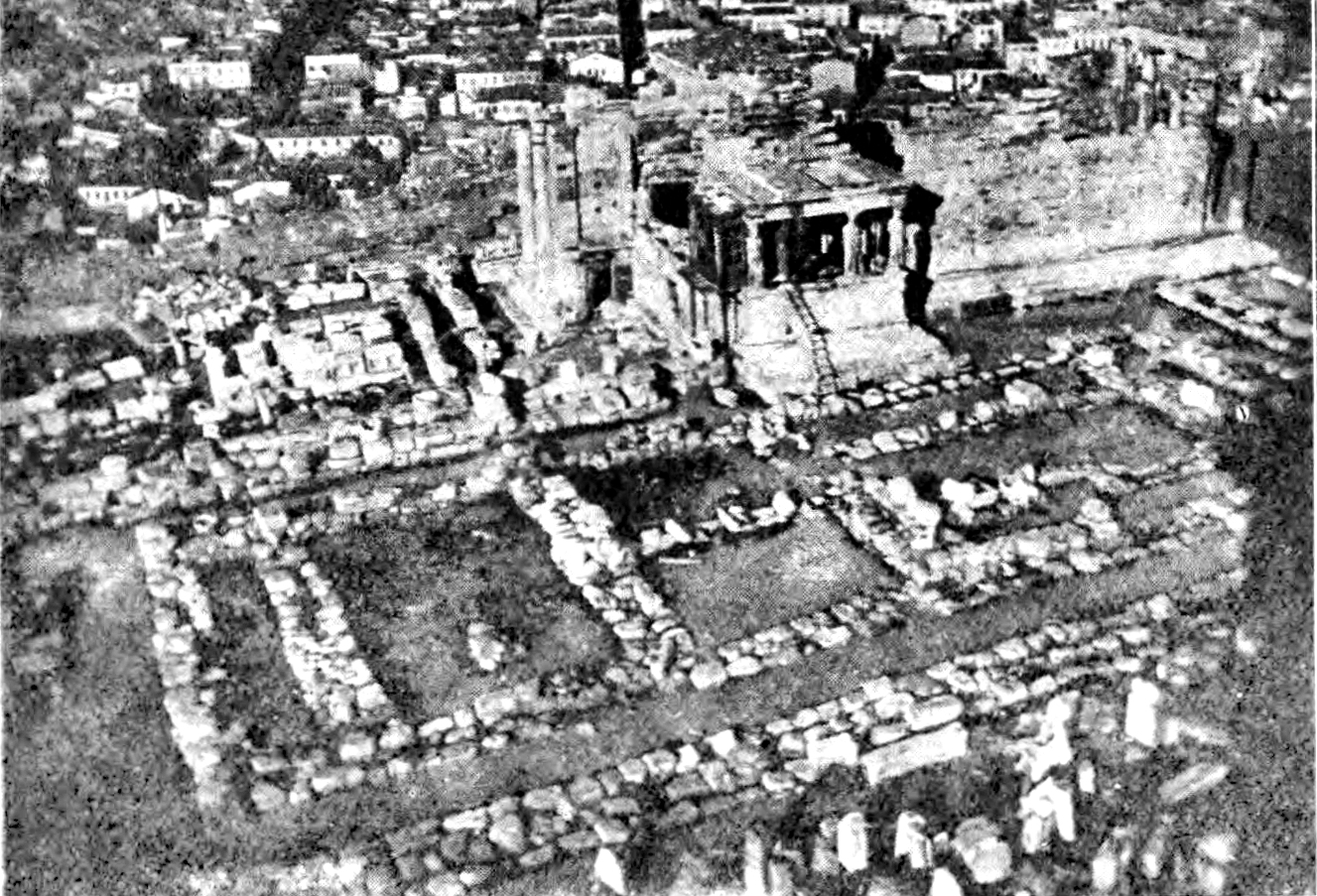
Remains of the Old Temple of Athena on the Acropolis, destroyed by the armies of Xerxes I during the Destruction of Athens.

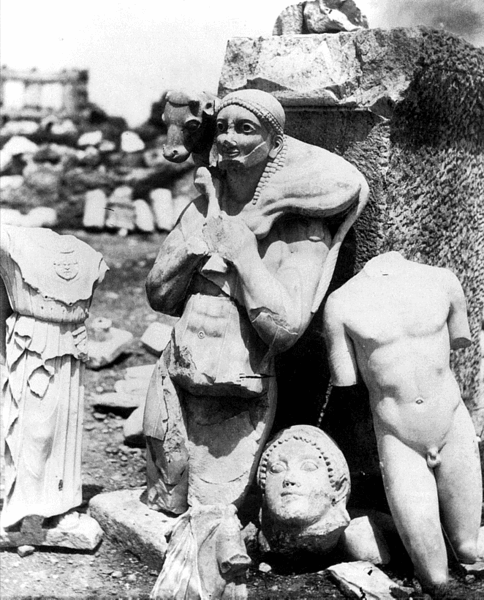
Part of the archaeological remains called Perserschutt, or "Persian rubble": remnants of the destruction of Athens by the armies of Xerxes. Photographed in 1866, just after excavation.

Victory at Thermopylae meant that all Boeotia fell to Xerxes; the two cities that had resisted him, Thespiae and Plataea, were captured and razed. Attica was also left open to invasion, and the remaining population of Athens was thus evacuated, with the aid of the Allied fleet, to Salamis. The Peloponnesian Allies began to prepare a defensive line across the Isthmus of Corinth, building a wall, and demolishing the road from Megara, thereby abandoning Athens to the Persians.

Athens fell a first time in September 480 BC. The small number of Athenians who had barricaded themselves on the Acropolis were eventually defeated, and Xerxes then ordered Athens to be torched. The Acropolis was razed and the Older Parthenon as well as the Old Temple of Athena were destroyed.

The Persians had now captured most of Greece, but Xerxes had perhaps not expected such defiance from the Greeks; his priority was now to complete the war as quickly as possible; the huge invasion force could not be supplied indefinitely, and probably Xerxes did not wish to be at the fringe of his empire for so long. Thermopylae had shown that a frontal assault against a well defended Greek position had little chance of success; with the Allies now dug in across the isthmus, there was therefore little chance of the Persians conquering the rest of Greece by land. However, if the isthmus's defensive line could be outflanked, the Allies could be defeated. Such an outflanking of the isthmus required the use of the Persian navy, and thus the neutralisation of the Allied navy. In summary, if Xerxes could destroy the Allied navy, he would be in a strong position to force a Greek surrender; this seemed the only hope of concluding the campaign in that season. Conversely by avoiding destruction, or as Themistocles hoped, by destroying the Persian fleet, the Greeks could avoid conquest. In the final reckoning, both sides were prepared to stake everything on a naval battle, in the hope of decisively altering the course of the war.

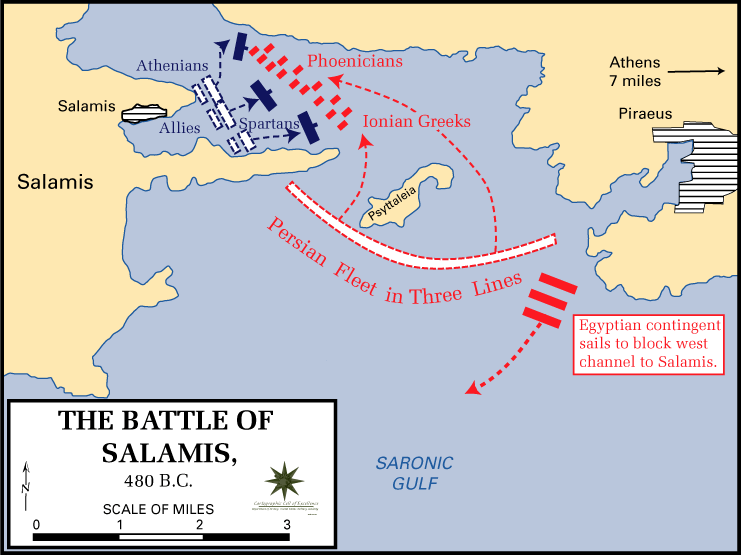

Thus, it was that the Allied fleet remained off the coast of Salamis into September, despite the imminent arrival of the Persians. Even after Athens fell to the advancing Persian army, the Allied fleet still remained off the coast of Salamis, trying to lure the Persian fleet to battle. Partly as a result of subterfuge on the part of Themistocles, the navies finally engaged in the cramped Straits of Salamis. There, the large Persian numbers were an active hindrance, as ships struggled to manoeuvre and became disorganised. Seizing the opportunity, the Greek fleet attacked, and scored a decisive victory, sinking or capturing at least 200 Persian ships, and thus ensuring the Peloponnesus would not be outflanked.

According to Herodotus, after this loss Xerxes attempted to build a causeway across the straits to attack Salamis (although Strabo and Ctesias place this attempt before the battle). In any case, this project was soon abandoned. With the Persians' naval superiority removed, Xerxes feared that the Greeks might sail to the Hellespont and destroy the pontoon bridges. According to Herodotus, Mardonius volunteered to remain in Greece and complete the conquest with a hand-picked group of troops, while advising Xerxes to retreat to Asia with the bulk of the army. All of the Persian forces abandoned Attica, with Mardonius over-wintering in Boeotia and Thessaly.

Some Athenians were thus able to return to their burnt-out city for the winter. They would have to evacuate again in front of a second advance by Mardonius in June 479 BC.

== Autumn/winter 480/479 BC ==
=== Siege of Potidaea ===
According to Herodotus a Persian general known as Artabazus escorted Xerxes to the Hellespont with 60,000 men; as he neared Pallene on the return journey to Thessaly: "he thought it right that he should enslave the people of Potidaea, whom he found in revolt". Despite attempts to capture Potidaea by treachery, the Persians were forced to keep up the siege for three months. Then, attempting to use an unusually low tide to attack the town from sea, the Persian army was caught by the returning tide, many drowning and the survivors being attacked by the Potideans in boats. Artabazus was thus forced to lift the siege, and return to Mardonius in Thessaly with the remnants of his men.

=== Siege of Olynthus ===
While besieging Potidea, Artabazus also decided to besiege Olynthus, which was also in revolt. The town was held by the Bottiaean tribe, who had been driven out of Macedon. Having taken the town, he massacred the defenders and handed over the town to the Chalcidian people.

== June 479 BC: Plataea and Mycale ==
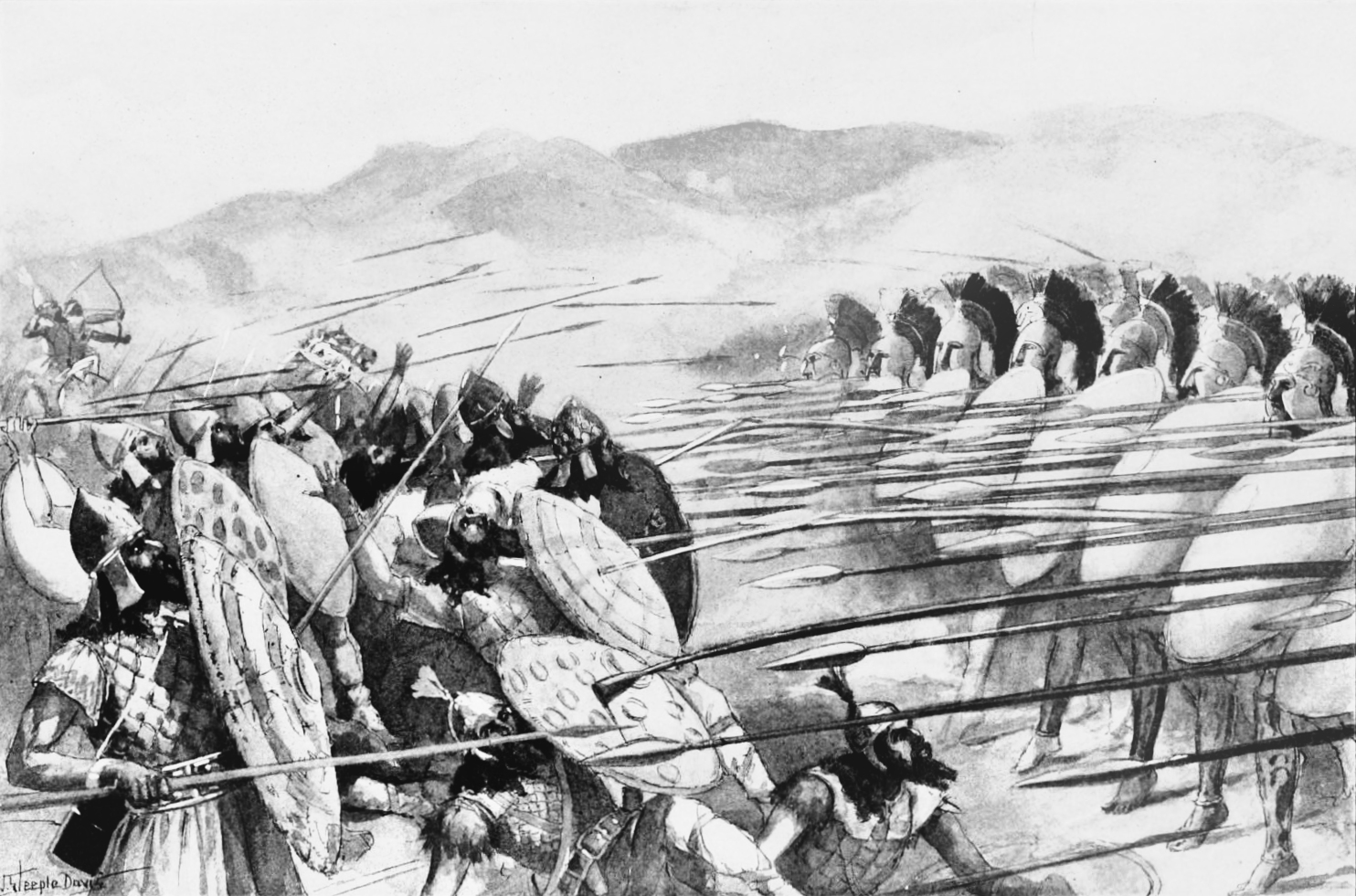
Battle of Plataea.

Over the winter, there seems to have been some tension between the Allies. In particular, the Athenians, who were not protected by the isthmus, but whose fleet were the key to the security of the Peloponnesus, felt aggrieved. They demanded an Allied army march north the following year. When the other Allies failed to commit to this, the Athenian fleet probably refused to join the Allied navy in the spring. The navy, now under the command of the Spartan king Leotychides, thus skulked off Delos, while the remnants of the Persian fleet skulked off Samos, both sides unwilling to risk battle. Similarly, Mardonius remained in Thessaly, knowing an attack on the isthmus was pointless, while the Allies refused to send an army outside the Peloponessus.

Mardonius moved to break the stalemate, by offering peace, self-government and territorial expansion to the Athenians (with the aim of thereby removing their fleet from the Allied forces), using Alexander I of Macedon as an intermediary. The Athenians made sure that a Spartan delegation was on hand to hear the offer, but rejected it. Athens was thus evacuated again, and the Persians marched south and re-took possession of it. Mardonius brought even more thorough destruction to the city. According to Herodotus, Mardonius "burnt Athens and utterly overthrew or demolished whatever wall or house or temple was left standing".

Mardonius now repeated his offer of peace to the Athenian refugees on Salamis. Athens, along with Megara and Plataea, sent emissaries to Sparta demanding assistance, and threatening to accept the Persian terms if not. The Spartans, who were at that time celebrating the festival of Hyacinthus, delayed making a decision for 10 days. However, when the Athenian emissaries then delivered an ultimatum to the Spartans, they were amazed to hear that a task force was in fact already marching to meet the Persians.

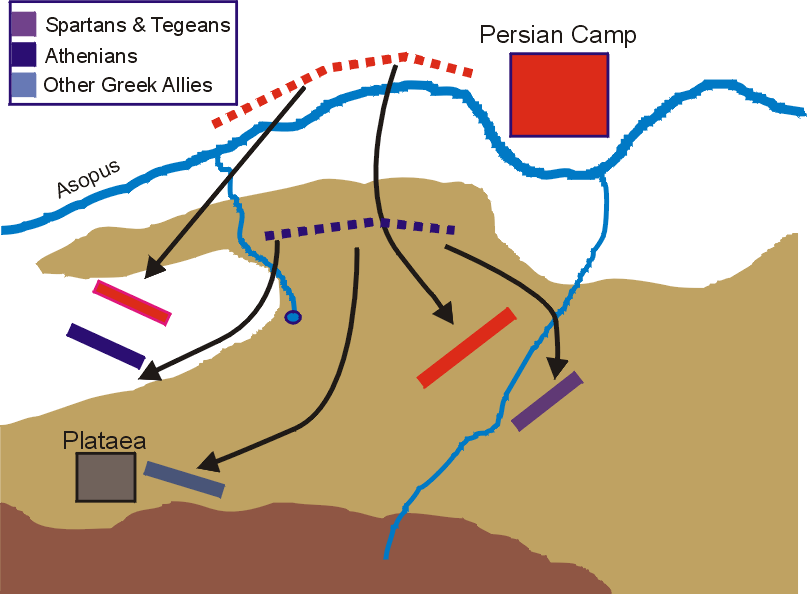
The main battle at Plataea. The Greek retreat becomes disorganised, and the Persians cross the Asopus to attack.

When Mardonius heard that the Allied army was on the march, he retreated into Boeotia, near Plataea, trying to draw the Allies into open terrain where he could use his cavalry. The Allied army however, under the command of the Spartan regent Pausanias, stayed on high ground above Plataea to protect themselves against such tactics. Mardonius ordered a hit-and-run cavalry attack on the Greek lines, but the attack was unsuccessful and the cavalry commander killed. The outcome prompted the Allies to move to a position nearer the Persian camp, still on high ground. As a result, the Allied lines of communication were exposed. The Persian cavalry began to intercept food deliveries and finally managed to destroy the only spring of water available to the Allies. The Allied position now undermined, Pausanias ordered a night-time retreat towards their original positions. This went awry, leaving the Athenians, and Spartans and Tegeans isolated on separate hills, with the other contingents scattered further away, near Plataea itself. Seeing that he might never have a better opportunity to attack, Mardonius ordered his whole army forward. However, as at Thermopylae, the Persian infantry proved no match for the heavily armoured Greek hoplites, and the Spartans broke through to Mardonius's bodyguard and killed him. The Persian force thus dissolved in rout; 40,000 troops managed to escape via the road to Thessaly, but the rest fled to the Persian camp where they were trapped and slaughtered by the Allies, thus finalising their victory.

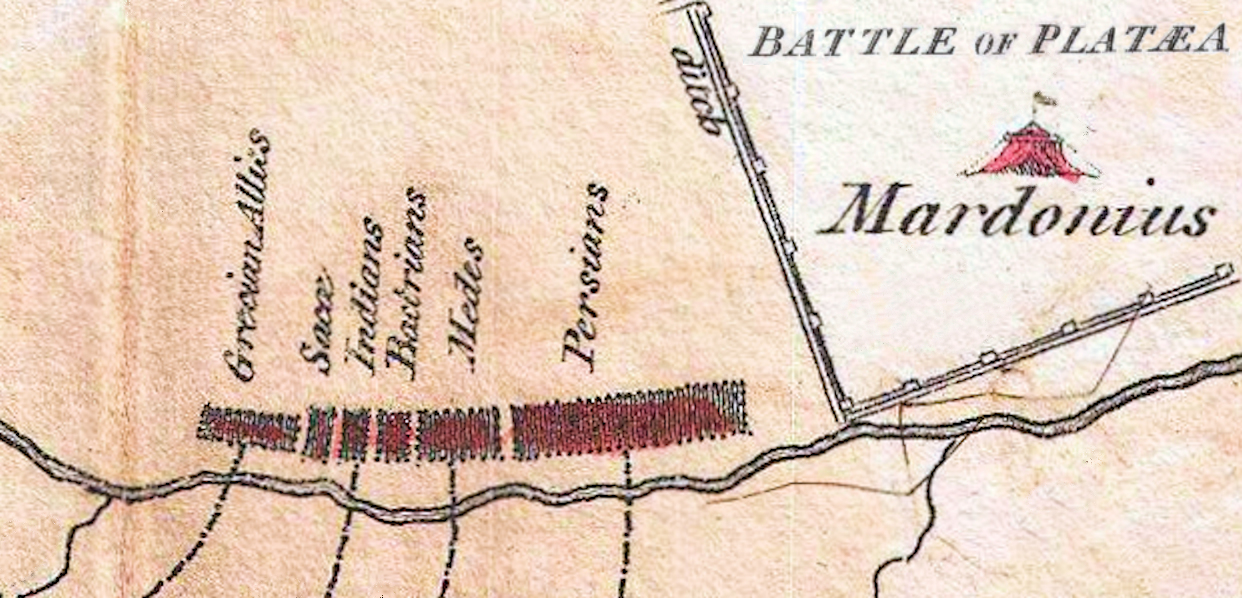
Achaemenid troops at the Battle of Plataea: Greek allies, Sacae, Indians, Bactrians, Medes and Persians, under Mardonius.

On the afternoon of the Battle of Plataea, Herodotus tells us that rumour of the Allied victory reached the Allied navy, at that time off the coast of Mount Mycale in Ionia. Their morale boosted, the Allied marines fought and won a decisive victory at the Battle of Mycale that same day, destroying the remnants of the Persian fleet. As soon as the Peloponnesians had marched north of the isthmus, the Athenian fleet under Xanthippus had joined up with the rest of the Allied fleet. The fleet, now able to match the Persians, had first sailed to Samos, where the Persian fleet was based. The Persians, whose ships were in a poor state of repair, had decided not to risk fighting and instead drew their ships up on the beach under Mycale. An army of 60,000 men had been left there by Xerxes, and the fleet joined with them, building a palisade around the camp to protect the ships. However, Leotychides decided to attack the camp with the Allied fleet's marines. Seeing the small size of the Allied force, the Persians emerged from the camp, but the hoplites again proved superior and destroyed much of the Persian force. The ships were abandoned to the Allies, who burnt them, crippling Xerxes' sea power, and marking the ascendancy of the Allied fleet.

== Aftermath ==
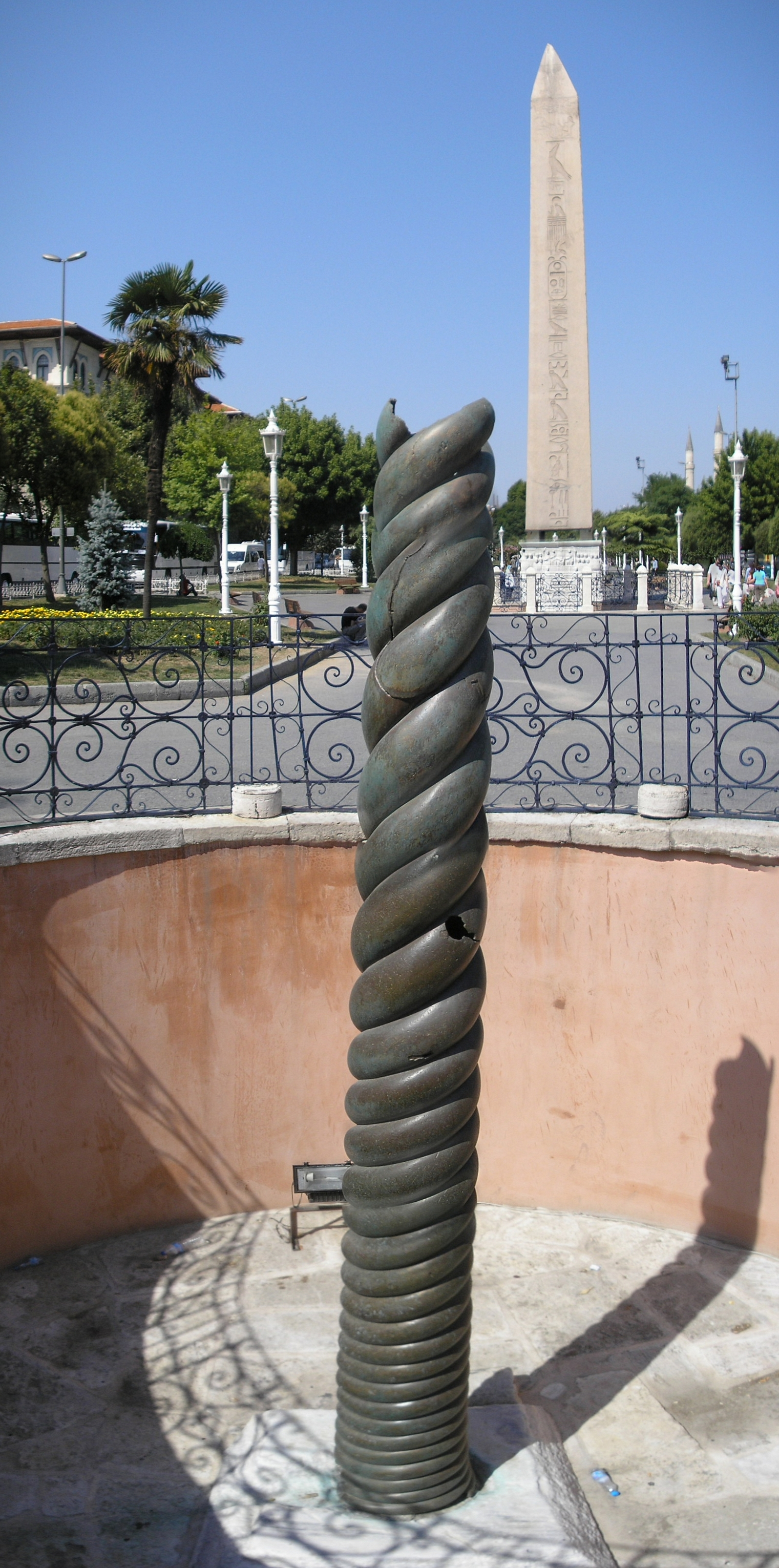
The Serpent Column, the remains of a monument dedicated by the victorious Allies

With the twin victories of Plataea and Mycale, the second Persian invasion of Greece was over. Moreover, the threat of future invasion was abated; although the Greeks remained worried that Xerxes would try again, over time it became apparent that the Persian desire to conquer Greece was much diminished.

In many ways Mycale represents the start of a new phase of the conflict, the Greek counterattack. After the victory at Mycale, the Allied fleet sailed to the Hellespont to break down the pontoon bridges, but found that this was already done. The Peloponnesians sailed home, but the Athenians remained to attack the Chersonesos, still held by the Persians. The Persians in the region and their allies made for Sestos, the strongest town in the region, which the Athenians then laid siege to; after a protracted siege, it fell to the Athenians. Herodotus ended his Historia after the Siege of Sestos.

Over the next 30 years, the Greeks, primarily the Athenian-dominated Delian League, would expel the Persians from Macedon, Thrace, the Aegean islands and Ionia. The Achaemenid maintained a strong presence at the doorstep of Greece, in Thrace, until circa 465 BC. In 477–455 BC, according to Thucydides, the allies campaigned against the city of Eion, at the mouth of the Strymon river. Eion was one of the Achaemenid garrisons left in Thrace during and after the second Persian invasion, along with Doriskos. Herodotus then alludes to several failed attempts, presumably Athenian, to dislodge the Persian governor of Doriskos, Mascames. The Achaemenids finally removed Mascames and their garrison at Doriskos circa 465 BC.

Peace with Persia came in 449 BC with the Peace of Callias, finally ending the half-century of warfare.

== Tactical analysis ==
The Greek style of warfare had been honed over the preceding centuries. It revolved around the hoplite, members of the middle-classes (the zeugites) who could afford the armour necessary to fight in this manner. The hoplite was, by the standards of the time, heavily armoured, with linothorax or a breastplate (originally bronze, but probably by this stage made of organic materials such as linen (possibly linothorax) and leather, greaves, a full helmet, and a large round shield (the aspis). Hoplites were armed with a long spear (the doru), which was evidently significantly longer than Persian spears, and a sword (the xiphos). Hoplites fought in the phalanx formation; the exact details are not completely clear, but it was a close-knit formation, presenting a uniform front of overlapping shields, and spears, to the enemy. Properly assembled, the phalanx was a formidable offensive and defensive weapon; on occasions when it is recorded to have happened, it took a huge number of light infantry to defeat a relatively small phalanx. It is also possible that the "leather armor" was actually untanned or partially tanned rawhide rather than fully tanned leather, because modern tests have concluded that plain or treated rawhide is a significantly better material for making armor than leather.

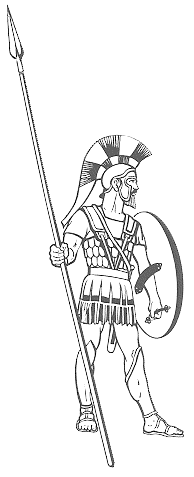
Diagram reconstructing the armament of a Greek hoplite

The phalanx was vulnerable to being outflanked by cavalry, if caught on the wrong terrain, however. The hoplite's heavy armour and long spears made them excellent troops in hand-to-hand combat and gave them significant protection against ranged attacks by light troops and skirmishers. Even if the shield did not stop a missile, there was a reasonable chance the armour would.

The Persian infantry used in the invasion were a heterogeneous group drawn from across the empire. However, according to Herodotus, there was at least a general conformity in the type of armour and style of fighting. The troops were, generally speaking, armed with a bow, 'short spear' and sword, carried a wicker shield and wore at most a leather jerkin. The one exception to this may have been the ethnic Persian troops, who may have worn a corslet of scaled armour. Some of the contingents may have been armed somewhat differently; for instance, the Saka were renowned axemen. The 'elite' contingents of the Persian infantry seem to have been the ethnic Persians, Medians, Cissians and the Saka. The foremost of the infantry were the royal guards, the Immortals, although they were still armed in the aforementioned style. Cavalry was provided by the Persians, Bactrians, Medes, Cissians and Saka; most of these probably fought as lightly armed missile cavalry. The style of fighting used by the Persians was probably to stand off from an enemy, using their bows (or equivalent) to wear down the enemy before closing in to deliver the coup de grace with spear and sword.

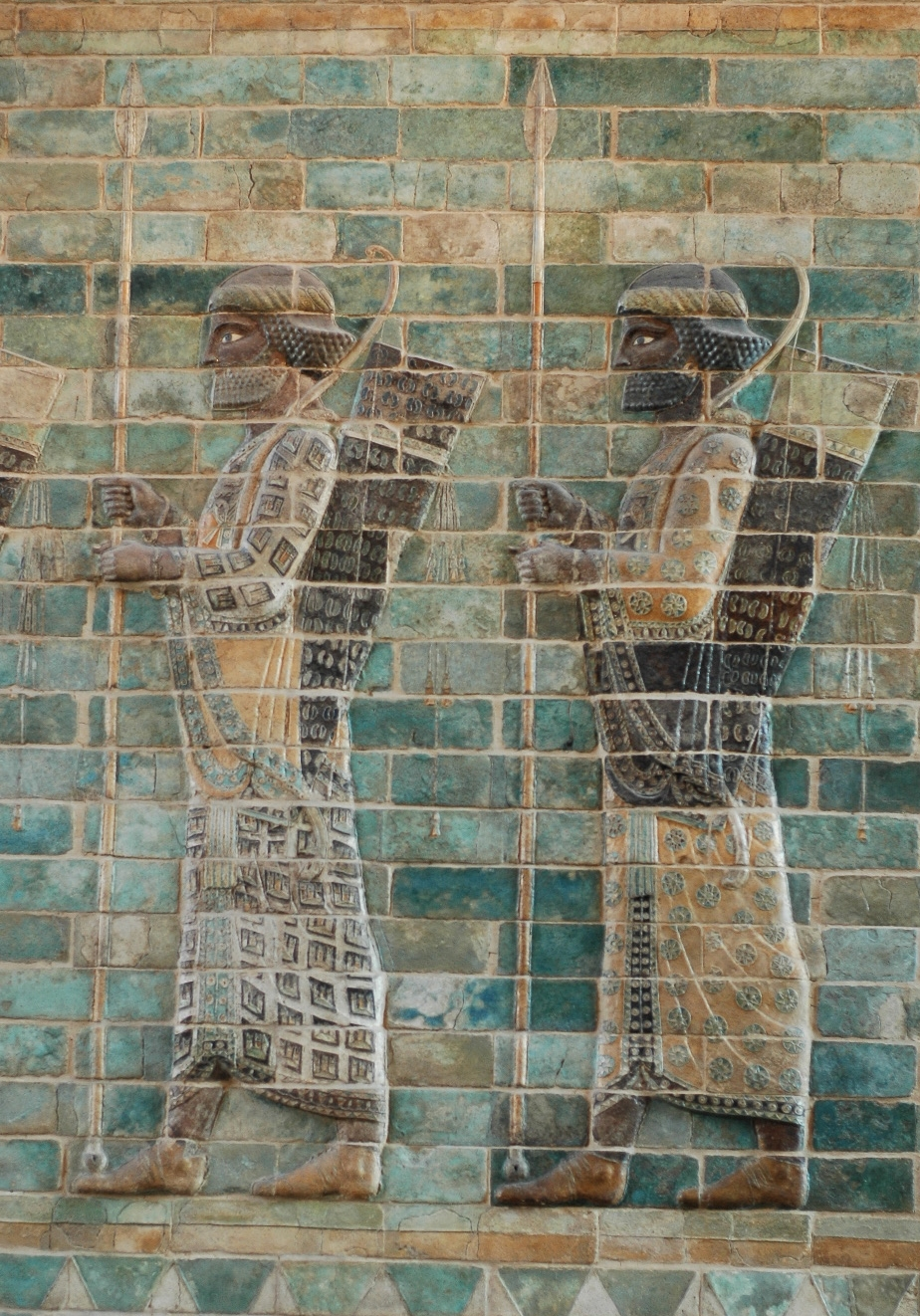
Persian soldiers, possibly Immortals, a frieze in Darius's palace at Susa. Silicious glazed bricks, c. 510 BC, Louvre.

The Persians had encountered hoplites in battle before at Ephesus, where their cavalry had easily routed the (probably exhausted) Greeks. However, at the battle of Marathon, the Athenian hoplites had shown their superiority over the Persian infantry, albeit in the absence of any cavalry. It is therefore slightly surprising that the Persians did not bring any hoplites from the Greek regions, especially Ionia, under their control in Asia. Equally, Herodotus tells us that the Egyptian marines serving in the navy were well armed, and performed well against the Greek marines; yet no Egyptian contingent served in the army. The Persians may not have completely trusted the Ionians and Egyptians, since both had recently revolted against Persian rule. However, if this is the case, then it must be questioned why there were Greek and Egyptian contingents in the navy. The Allies evidently tried to play on the Persian fears about the reliability of the Ionians in Persian service; but, as far as we can tell, both the Ionians and Egyptians performed particularly well for the Persian navy. It may therefore simply be that neither the Ionians nor Egyptians were included in the army because they were serving in the fleet — none of the coastal regions of the Persian empire appear to have sent contingents with the army.

In the two major land battles of the invasion, the Allies clearly adjusted their tactics to nullify the Persian advantage in numbers and cavalry, by occupying the pass at Thermopylae and by staying on high ground at Plataea. At Thermopylae, until the path outflanking the Allied position was revealed, the Persians signally failed to adjust their tactics to the situation, although the position was well chosen to limit the Persian options. At Plataea, the harassing of the Allied positions by cavalry was a successful tactic, forcing the precipitous (and nearly disastrous) retreat; however, Mardonius then brought about a general melee between the infantry, which resulted in the Persian defeat. The events at Mycale reveal a similar story; Persian infantry committing themselves to a melee with hoplites, with disastrous results. It has been suggested that there is little evidence of complex tactics in the Greco-Persian wars. However, as simple as the Greek tactics were, they played to their strengths; the Persians, however, may have seriously underestimated the strength of the hoplite, and their failure to adapt to facing the Allied infantry contributed to the eventual Persian defeat.

== Strategic analysis ==
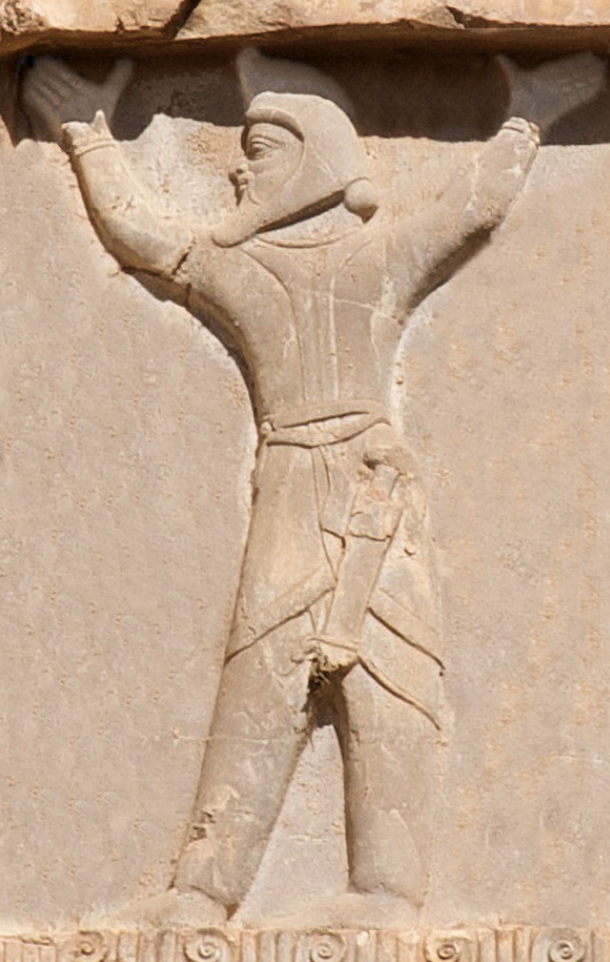
The Scythians (Sakas) formed a large portion of the Achaemenid army. Detail of the tomb of Xerxes I at Naqsh-e Rostam, circa 480 BC.

At the beginning of the invasion, the Persians held most advantages. Regardless of its actual size, it is clear that the Persians had brought an overwhelming number of troops and ships to Greece. The Persians had a unified command system, and everyone was answerable to the king. They had a hugely efficient bureaucracy, which allowed them to undertake remarkable feats of planning. The Persian generals had significant experience of warfare over the 80 years in which the Persian empire had been established. Furthermore, the Persians excelled in the use of intelligence and diplomacy in warfare, as shown by their (nearly successful) attempts to divide and conquer the Greeks. The Greeks, by comparison, were fragmented, with only 30 or so city-states actively opposing the Persian invasion; even those were prone to quarrel with one another. They had little experience of large-scale warfare, being largely restricted to small-scale local warfare, and their commanders were chosen primarily on the basis of the political and social standing, rather than because of any experience or expertise. As Lazenby therefore asks: "So why did the Persians fail?"

The Persian strategy for 480 BC was probably to simply progress through Greece in overwhelming force. The cities in any territory that the army passed through would be forced to submit or risk destruction; and indeed this happened with the Thessalian, Locrian and Phocian cities who initially resisted the Persians but then were forced to submit as the Persians advanced. Conversely, the Allied strategy was probably to try and stop the Persian advance as far north as possible, and thus prevent the submission of as many potential Allies as possible. Beyond this, the Allies seem to have realised that given the Persians' overwhelming numbers, they had little chance in open battle, and thus they opted to try to defend geographical bottle-necks, where the Persian numbers would count for less. The whole Allied campaign for 480 BC can be seen in this context. Initially they attempted to defend the Tempe pass to prevent the loss of Thessaly. After they realised that they could not defend this position, they chose the next-most northerly position, the Thermopylae/Artemisium axis. The Allied performance at Thermopylae was initially effective; however, the failure to properly guard the path that outflanked Thermopylae undermined their strategy, and led to defeat. At Artemisium the fleet also scored some successes, but withdrew due to the losses they had sustained, and since the defeat of Thermopylae made the position irrelevant. Thus far, the Persian strategy had succeeded, while the Allied strategy, though not a disaster, had failed.

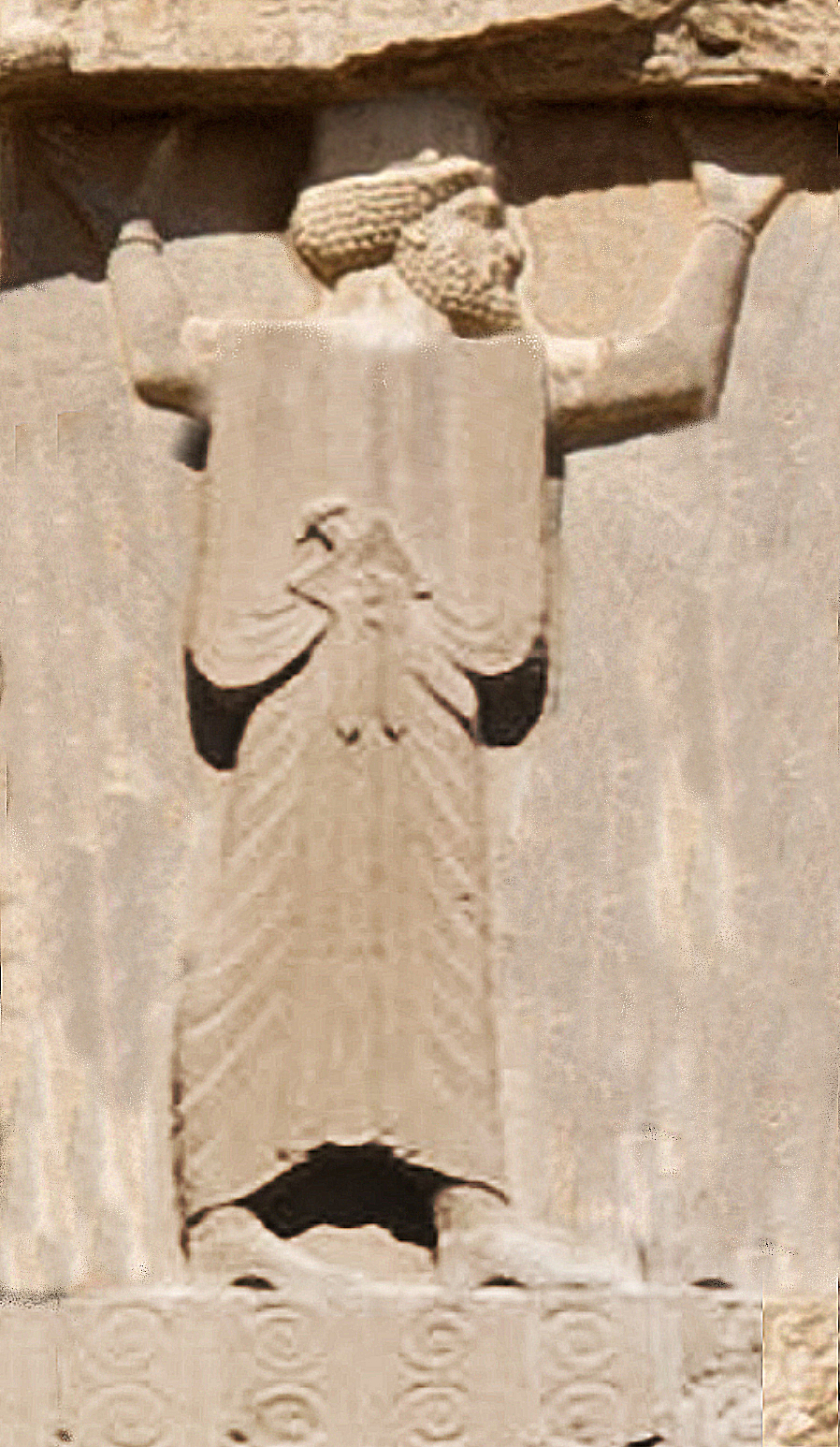
A Persian soldier of the Achaemenid army. Detail of the tomb of Xerxes I at Naqsh-e Rostam, circa 480 BC.

The defence of the Isthmus of Corinth by the Allies changed the nature of the war. The Persians did not attempt to attack the isthmus by land, realising they probably could not breach it. This essentially reduced the conflict to a naval one. Themistocles now proposed what was in hindsight the strategic masterstroke in the Allied campaign; to lure the Persian fleet to battle in the straits of Salamis. However, as successful as this was, there was no need for the Persians to fight at Salamis to win the war; it has been suggested that the Persians were either overconfident or overeager to finish the campaign. Thus, the Allied victory at Salamis must at least partially be ascribed to a Persian strategic blunder. After Salamis, the Persian strategy changed. Mardonius sought to exploit dissensions between the Allies in order to fracture the alliance. In particular, he sought to win over the Athenians, which would leave the Allied fleet unable to oppose Persian landings on the Peloponnesus. Although Herodotus tells us that Mardonius was keen to fight a decisive battle, his actions in the run-up to Plataea are not particularly consistent with this. He seems to have been willing to accept battle on his terms, but he waited either for the Allies to attack, or for the alliance to collapse ignominiously. The Allied strategy for 479 BC was something of a mess; the Peloponnesians only agreed to march north in order to save the alliance, and it appears that the Allied leadership had little idea how to force a battle that they could win. It was the botched attempt to retreat from Plataea that finally delivered the Allies battle on their terms. Mardonius may have been overeager for victory; there was no need to attack the Allies, and by doing so he played to the main Allied tactical strength, combat in the melee. The Allied victory at Plataea can also therefore be seen as partially the result of a Persian mistake.

Thus, the Persian failure may be seen partly as a result of two strategic mistakes that handed the Allies tactical advantages, and resulted in decisive defeats for the Persians. The Allied success is often seen as the result of "free men fighting for their freedom". This may have played a part, and certainly the Greeks seem to have interpreted their victory in those terms. One crucial factor in the Allied success was that, having formed an alliance, however fractious, they remained true to it, despite the odds. There appear to have been many occasions when the alliance seemed in doubt, but ultimately it withstood; and while this alone did not defeat the Persians, it meant that even after the occupation of most of Greece, the Allies were not themselves defeated. This is exemplified by the remarkable fact that the citizens of Athens, Thespiae and Plataea chose to carry on fighting from exile rather than submit to the Persians. Ultimately, the Allies succeeded because they avoided catastrophic defeats, stuck to their alliance, took advantage of Persian mistakes, and because in the hoplite they possessed an advantage (perhaps their only real advantage at the start of the conflict), which, at Plataea, allowed them to destroy the Persian invasion force.

== Significance and Legacy ==
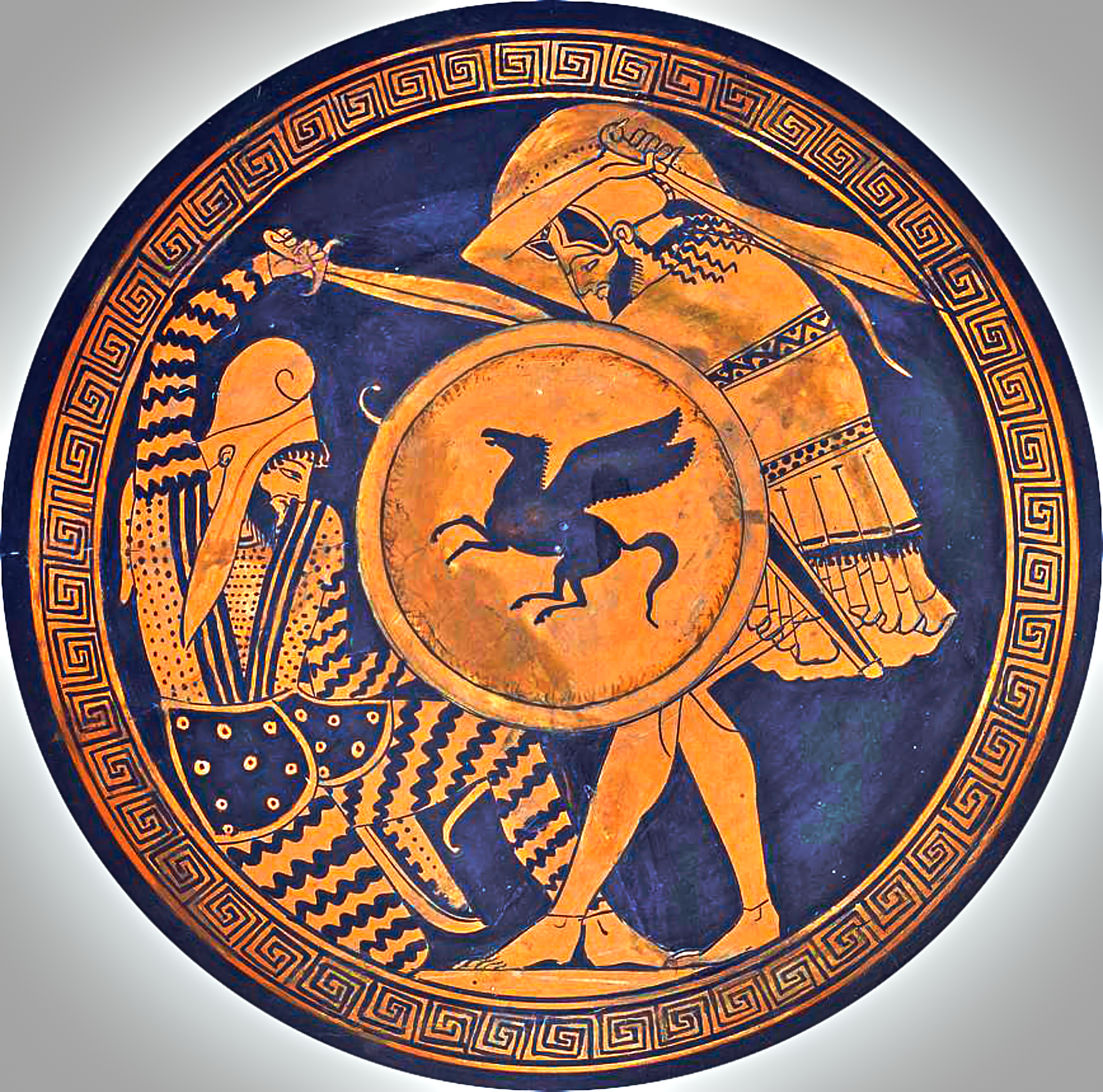
Greek hoplite and Persian warrior depicted fighting. Ancient kylix, 5th century BC.

The second Persian invasion of Greece was an event of major significance in European history. A large number of historians hold that, had Greece been conquered, the Ancient Greek culture that lies at the basis of Western civilization would have never developed (and by extension Western civilization itself). While this may be an exaggeration, it is clear that even at the time the Greeks understood that something very significant had happened.

Militarily, there was not much in the way of tactical or strategic innovation during the Persian invasion, one commentator suggesting it was something of "a soldier's war" (i.e., it was the soldiers rather than generals that won the war). Thermopylae is often used as a good example of the use of terrain as a force multiplier, while Themistocles's ruse before Salamis is a good example of the use of deception in warfare. The major lesson of the invasion, reaffirming the events at the Battle of Marathon, was the superiority of the hoplite in close-quarters fighting over the more-lightly armed Persian infantry. Taking on this lesson, the Persian empire would later, after the Peloponnesian War, start recruiting and relying on Greek mercenaries.

== Bibliography ==
=== Ancient sources ===
- Herodotus, The Histories
  - Macan translation of books 7–9 of The Histories (The Perseus Digital Library) (1908)
  - Macauley translation of The Histories
- Diodorus Siculus, Biblioteca Historica
- Ctesias, Persica (from Photius's Epitome)

=== Modern sources ===
- Holland, Tom (2006). Persian Fire: The First World Empire and the Battle for the West. Abacus, ISBN 0-385-51311-9.
- Green, Peter (1996). The Greco-Persian Wars. University of California Press.
- de Souza, Philip (2003). The Greek and Persian Wars, 499–386 BC. Osprey Publishing, (ISBN 1-84176-358-6)
- Lazenby, JF (1993). The Defence of Greece 490–479 BC. Aris & Phillips Ltd., (ISBN 0-85668-591-7)
- Burn, A.R., "Persia and the Greeks" in The Cambridge History of Iran, Volume 2: The Median and Achaemenid Periods, Ilya Gershevitch, ed. (1985). Cambridge University Press.
- Sekunda, Nicholas (1992). The Persian Army 560-330 BC. Elite Series 42. Simon Chew (illustrator). London: Osprey. ISBN 978-1-85532-250-9.
- Shahbazi, A. Shapour (2012). "The Achaemenid Persian Empire (550–330 BCE)". In Daryaee, Touraj (ed.). The Oxford Handbook of Iranian History. Oxford University Press. ISBN 978-0190208820.
- Bradford, E. Thermopylae: The Battle for the West. Da Capo Press, ISBN 0-306-81360-2.
- Strauss, Barry. The Battle of Salamis: The Naval Encounter That Saved Greece—and Western Civilization. New York: Simon and Schuster, 2004 (hardcover, ISBN 0-7432-4450-8; paperback, ISBN 0-7432-4451-6).
- Bury, J. B. & Meiggs, R. (2000). A History of Greece to the Death of Alexander the Great (4th Revised Edition). Palgrave Macmillan.
- Grote, G. A History of Greece: Part II.
- Maurice, F (1930). "The size of the army of Xerxes in the invasion of Greece 480 BC". Journal of Hellenic Studies vol. 50, pp. 115–128.
- Delbrück, Hans (1920). History of the Art of War. University of Nebraska Press. Reprint edition, 1990. Translated by Walter, J. Renfroe. 4 Volumes.
- Warry, J. (1998). Warfare in the Classical World. ISBN 1-84065-004-4.
- Engels, DW. (1978). Alexander the Great and the Logistics of the Macedonian Army. Berkeley/Los Angeles/London.
- Roisman, Joseph; Worthington, Ian (2011). A Companion to Ancient Macedonia. John Wiley and Sons. ISBN 978-1-44-435163-7.
- Scott, JA (1915). "Thoughts on the Reliability of Classical Writers, with Especial Reference to the Size of the Army of Xerxes", The Classical Journal 10 (9).
- von Fischer, R. Das Zahlenproblem in Perserkriege 480–479 v. Chr. Klio, N. F., vol. VII.
- Cohen, R (1934). La Grece et l'hellenization du monde antique.
- Tarn, WW. (1908). "The Fleet of Xerxes", The Journal of Hellenic Studies v.28.
- Obst, E. (1914). Der Feldzug des Xerxes. Leipzig.
- Munro, JAR (1929). Cambridge Ancient History vol. IV.
- Köster, AJ (1934). Studien zur Geschichte des Antikes Seewesens. Klio Belheft 32.
- Οι δυνάμεις των Ελλήνων και των Περσών (The forces of the Greeks and the Persians), E Istorika no. 164 19 October 2002.
- Papademetriou, K (2005). "Περσικό Πεζικό: Η δύναμη που κατέκτησε τη νοτιοδυτική Ασία" (Persian Infantry: The force that conquered southwest Asia), Panzer magazine, Issue 22 September–October 2005, Periscopio editions Athens.
- Fehling, D (1989). Herodotus and His "Sources": Citation, Invention, and Narrative Art. Translated by J. G. Howie. Leeds: Francis Cairns.
- Finley, Moses (1972). "Introduction". Thucydides – History of the Peloponnesian War (translated by Rex Warner). Penguin. ISBN 0-14-044039-9.
- Eikenberry, Lt. Gen. Karl W. (Summer 1996). "Take No Casualties". Parameters: US Army War College Quarterly. XXVI (2): 109–118. Archived from the original on June 9, 2007.
