= Eordea =

Scientific classification
- Kingdom: Animalia
- Phylum: Arthropoda
- Subphylum: Chelicerata
- Class: Arachnida
- Order: Araneae
- Infraorder: Araneomorphae
- Family: Linyphiidae
- Genus: Eordea; Simon, 1899
- Species: E. bicolor

Binomial name
- Eordea bicolor Simon, 1899

Genus of spiders

Eordea is a monotypic genus of Southeast Asian dwarf spiders containing the single species Eordea bicolor. It was first described by Eugène Louis Simon in 1899, and has only been found in Indonesia.
