= Boryza (city) =

Boryza was a Persian city in Thrace (Achaemenid satrapy of Skudra) founded by King Darius the Great (r. 522–486 BC). Hecataeus of Miletus (died c. 476 BC) mentioned Boryza as being located in the land of the Thynians on the southwestern Black Sea coast to the north of Byzantium, modern day Bulgaria and Turkey. The city was also mentioned by Stephanus of Byzantium (fl. 6th century AD). According to the modern historian Miroslav Izdimirski, Boryza must have been the residence of a Persian hyparch.

Boryza's precise location remains unknown and the date of its foundation is debated; it was either founded before or during Darius's European Scythian campaign.

== Sources ==
- Izdimirski, Miroslav (2013). "Persian hyparchoi and strategoi in ancient Thrace according to Herodotus". Orpheus: Journal of Indo-European and Thracian Studies. 20. Sofia, Bulgaria: Institute of Balkan Studies & Centre of Thracology (Bulgarian Academy of Sciences).
- Rehm, Ellen (2010). Nieling, Jens; Rehm, Ellen (eds.). "The Impact of the Achaemenids on Thrace: A Historical Review". Achaemenid Impact in the Black Sea: Communication of Powers. Black Sea Studies. 11. Aarhus University Press. ISBN 978-8779342606.
- Vasilev, Miroslav Ivanov (2015). The Policy of Darius and Xerxes towards Thrace and Macedonia. Brill. ISBN 978-9004282155.
- Vassileva, Maya (2015). "Persia". In Valeva, Julia; Nankov, Emil; Graniger, Denver (eds.). A Companion to Ancient Thrace. John Wiley & Sons, Inc. ISBN 9781444351040.
