= Muhammad Dandamayev =

Russian historian (1928–2017)

Muhammad Abdulkadyrovich Dandamayev (Lak: Мухаммад Абдулкадырович Дандамаев; September 2, 1928 – August 28, 2017), Chief Researcher at the Institute of Oriental Manuscripts of the Russian Academy of Sciences (IOM-RAS), was a historian who focused on the ancient Persian Empire, and the social institutions of Babylonia during the first millennium BCE.

== Works ==
=== Books ===
- Dandamayev, M. A. (1989). A political history of the Achaemenid empire. Leiden: Brill. ISBN 90-04-09172-6.
- M. A. Dandamayev (1992). Iranians in Achaemenid Babylonia. Mazda Publishers in association with Bibliotheca Persica. 241 pages
- Muhammad A. Dandamayev, Vladimir G. Lukonin (2004) : The Culture and Social Institutions of Ancient Iran. Cambridge University Press. 480 pages.
- Muhammad A. Dandamayev, Marvin A. Powell, David B. Weisberg (2008). Slavery in Babylonia: From Nabopolassar to Alexander the Great (626-331 B.C.). Northern Illinois University Press. 836 pages.
- Dandamayev M.А. Mesopotamia and Iran in the 7th-4th Centuries B.C.: Social Institutions and Ideology [Месопотамия и Иран в VII—IV вв. до н.э.: Социальные институты и идеология]. St Petersburg: St. Petersburg State University Faculty of Philology and Arts 2007. 512 p.
- Dandamayev M.A. The Babylonian Scribes [Вавилонские писцы]. Moscow, Nauka GRVL Publishers 1983.
- Dandamayev M.A. The Slavery in Babylonia during the 7th to 8th Centuries BCE (626-331) [Рабство в Вавилонии VII - IV вв. до н.э. (626 - 331 гг.)]. Moscow: Nauka GRVL Publishers 1974.
- Азиатский музей - Ленинградское отделение Института востоковедения АН СССР / Редакционная коллегия: А.П.Базиянц, Д.Е.Бертельс (отв. секретарь), Б.Г.Гафуров, А.Н.Кононов (председатель), Е.И.Кычанов, И.М.Оранский, Ю.А.Петросян, Э.Н.Тёмкин, О.Л.Фишман, А.Б.Халидов, И.Ш.Шифман. М.: «Наука», 1972.
