= List of Thracian Greeks =

This is a list of Greeks from Thrace.

== Ancient ==
=== Artists ===
- Brygos Attic Painter/Potter (possibly of Thracian origin)
- Athenion of Maroneia Painter
- Boethus of Chalcedon Sculptor

=== Athletes ===
- _of Maroneia Pale Greek Wrestling Olympics 476 BC

=== Grammarians ===
- Aristarchus of Samothrace
- Aristophanes of Byzantium
- Dionysius Thrax

=== Historians ===
- Thucydides
- Hecataeus of Abdera
- Stephanus of Byzantium
- Hieronymus of Cardia

=== Mathematicians ===
- Bion of Abdera
- Philo of Byzantium
- Epigenes of Byzantium

=== Mythic Lovers ===
- Hero and Leander

=== Philosophers ===
- Leucippus
- Protagoras
- Diogenes Apolloniates
- Thrasymachus
- Democritus
- Xenocrates
- Anaxarchus
- Hecataeus of Abdera
- Hipparchia of Maroneia
- Metrocles
- Antisthenes of Athens

=== Physicians ===
- Herodicus

=== Poets ===
- Nicaenetus of Samos
- Sotades of Maroneia
- Phaedimus of Bisanthe

=== Rulers-Politicians ===
- Miltiades the Elder
- Miltiades
- Cimon
- Themistocles
- Cleophon (politician)
- Thucydides
- Nymphodorus of Abdera
- Python of Aenus
- Heraclides of Aenus
- Eumenes
- Lysimachus
- Agathocles (son of Lysimachus)

==== Hellenized Thracians ====
- List of rulers of Bithynia
  - Nicomedes I of Bithynia
- Spartocid dynasty
- Abrotonum
- Olorus
- Hegesipyle of Olorus
- Dolonci (Δόλογγες)

== Medieval ==
- Photios I of Constantinople
- Nikephoros Bryennios (ethnarch)
- Komnenos dynasty
  - Manuel Erotikos Komnenos

=== Byzantine Emperors from Thrace ===
- Tiberius II Constantine
- Phocas
- Macedonian dynasty
  - Basil I the Macedonian
  - Basil II
- John II Komnenos
- Manuel Komnenos
- Vatatzes
  - John Doukas Vatatzes
- John V Palaiologos
- Constantine Palaiologos

== Modern ==
- Antonios Komizopoulos
- Alexandros Mavrokordatos
- Karpos Papadopoulos
- Joachim III of Constantinople
- Georgios Vizyinos
- Constantin Carathéodory
- Kostas Varnalis
- Nikos Zachariadis
- Christos Tsigiridis
- maternal grandparents of Alexis Tsipras
- Manos Hatzidakis

== Ancient Greek cities in Thrace ==
=== Aegean Thrace ===
In order from west to east:

- Stryme
- Abdera
- Ismaros
- Maroneia
- Samothrace
- Aenus
- Lysimachia

=== Thracian Chersonese ===
- Abydos, Hellespont
- Alopeconnesus
- Aegospotami
- Callipolis
- Cardia
- Elaeus
- Sestus

=== Propontis ===
- Bisanthe
- Perinthus
- Selymbria

=== Bosporus ===
- Byzantium, later renamed Constantinople
- Chalcedon

=== Pontus Euxinus ===
In order from north to south:

- Histria
- Tomi
- Callatis
- Dionysopolis or Krounoi
- Odessos or Odessopolis
- Naulochos
- Mesembria
- Anchialos
- Apollonia
- Agathopolis

== See also ==
- Eastern Macedonia-Thrace
  - Western Thrace
- East Thrace
- Northern Thrace
  - Eastern Rumelia
- Thracia
- Thrace (theme)
- Macedonia (theme)
- Adrianople
- Byzantines
- Romioi
