= Philaidae =

Noble family of ancient Athens

The Philaidae or Philaids (Ancient Greek: Φιλαΐδαι) were a powerful noble family of ancient Athens. They were conservative land-owning aristocrats and many of them were very wealthy. The Philaidae produced two of the most famous generals in Athenian history: Miltiades the Younger and Cimon.

The Philaids claimed descent from the mythological Philaeus, son of Ajax. The family originally came from Brauron in Attica. Later a prominent branch of the clan were based at Lakiadae west of Athens. In the late 7th century BC a Philaid called Agamestor married the daughter of Cypselus, the powerful tyrant of Corinth. In 597 BC a man named Cypselus was archon of Athens. This Cypselus was probably grandson of the Corinthian tyrant of the same name and son of Agamestor.

Some years before 566 BC, a member of the Philaid clan, Hippocleides, was a suitor for the hand of Agariste, the daughter of the influential tyrant of Sicyon, Cleisthenes. However Hippocleides lost out to Megacles from the rival Alcmaeonid clan when Cleisthenes was unimpressed with a drunken Hippocleides who stood on his head and kicked his heels in the air at a banquet.

== Tyrants of the Thracian Chersonese ==
In c.560-556 BC a Thracian tribe, the Dolonci, offered the rule of the Thracian Chersonese (a peninsula in a strategic location dominating the grain route through the Hellespont) to the Philaid Miltiades the Elder, the son of Cypselus the archon. Miltiades accepted the offer and became tyrant of the Chersonese. He built a wall across the Bulair Isthmus to protect the peninsula from raiders from Thrace. Pisistratus, the tyrant of Athens, did not object to Miltiades leaving Athens to set himself up as a semi-independent ruler on the far side of the Aegean Sea as it removed a potential rival from the city and gave him a useful role as an ally of Athens in a strategically important location.

Meanwhile a Philaid called Cimon Coalemos, ('coalemos' meaning simpleton), won the prestigious Olympic chariot race three times in succession during the rule of Pisistratid tyrants. He earned a recall from exile by dedicating his second victory to Pisistratus but when he unwisely continued his winning streak by notching up a famous third consecutive Olympic victory he fell foul of Pisistratus' sons Hippias and Hipparchus who had him assassinated.

Around 534 BC Miltiades the Elder died and the tyranny of the Thracian Chersonese passed to his step-brother's son Stesagoras. Then in c.520 BC Stesagoras was succeeded by his brother Miltiades the Younger, son of Cimon Coalemus. This younger Miltiades cemented good relations with neighbouring Thracian tribes by marrying Hegesipyle daughter of the Thracian king Olorus.

Miltiades the Younger also served with King Darius I of Persia during his campaign against the Scythians in c.513 BC and when the Greek contingents were left guarding a bridge over the Danube River Miltiades tried to convince his fellow Greeks to demolish the bridge so as to leave the Persian king stranded in Scythia (or so he later claimed).

== Miltiades returns to Athens ==
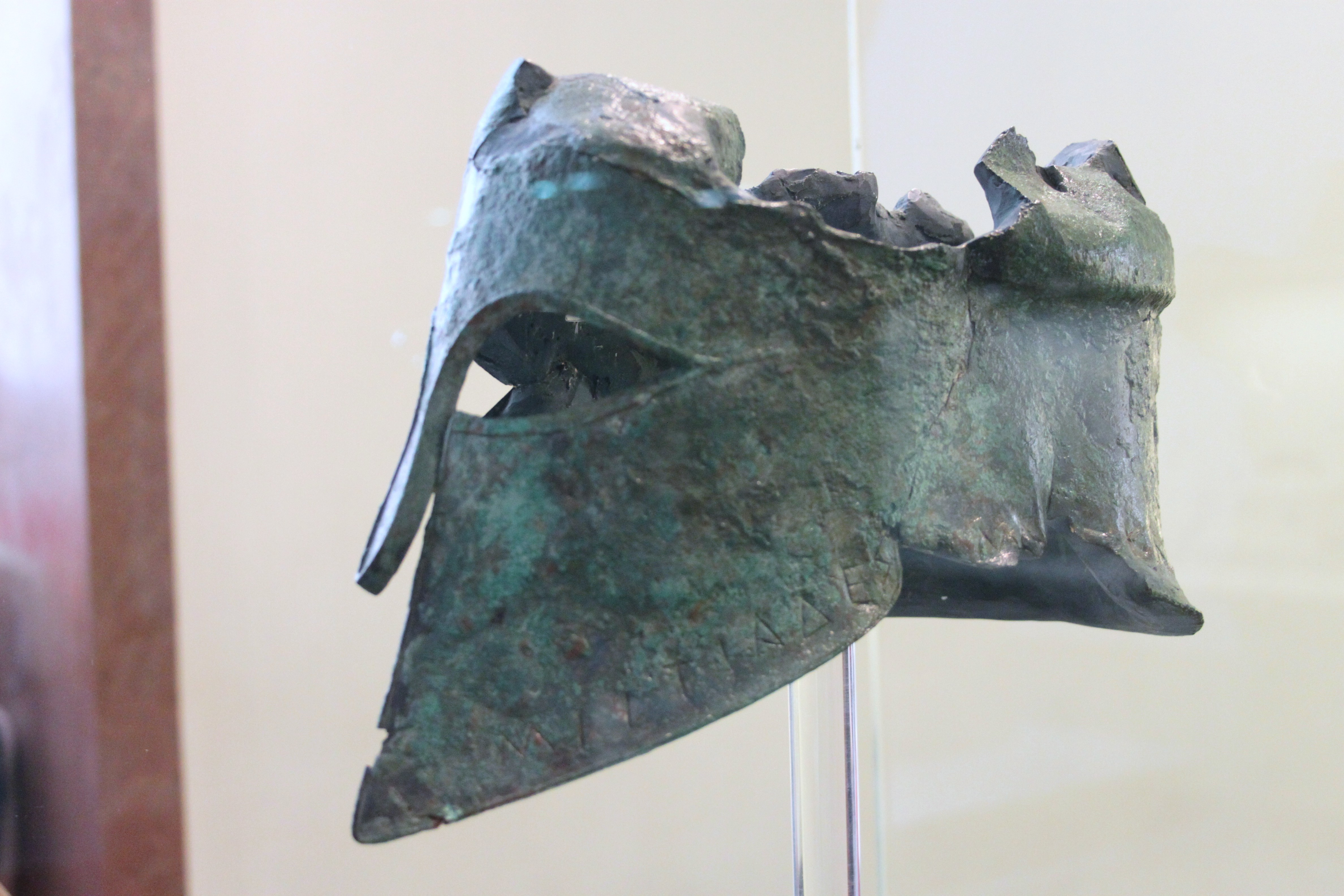
The "Helmet of Miltiades" was given as an offering to the Temple of Zeus at Olympia. Archaeological Museum of Olympia

After Miltiades took part in the failed Ionian Revolt against the Persian Empire he fled the Chersonese and returned to Athens in c.493 BC. He survived a prosecution for tyranny and when the Persians landed at Marathon in 490 BC Miltiades, as one of ten generals (strategoi) played the major part in winning the battle for Athens.

Miltiades now enjoyed great prestige at Athens as the victor of Marathon. The following year he was given command of forces which besieged the pro-Persian island of Paros. However the expedition was ill-fated as Miltiades failed to capture the city of Paros and fell off a wall during the siege operations and arrived back in Athens with gangrene in his leg.

The debacle of the Parian expedition led Miltiades' enemies to renew their attacks on him in court and just one year after the victory at Marathon Miltiades the Younger died from his infected leg.

== Cimon leads the war against Persia ==
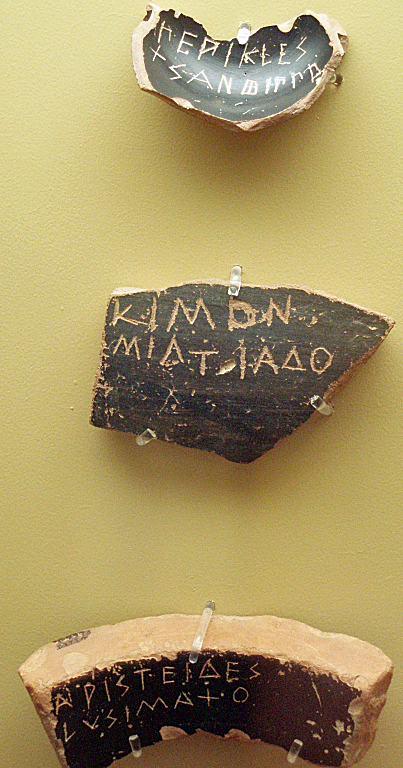
Pieces of broken pottery (Ostracon) as voting tokens for ostracism. The second ostracon from the top nominates Cimon son of Miltiades for ostracism.

After the Greek victories over Persia at Salamis, Plataea and Mycale in 480-479 BC the Athenians soon took the lead in launching an offensive against Persian forces in the Aegean region. The Philaid Cimon, son of Miltiades the Younger and grandson of Cimon the Olympic victor, became the leading general of this offensive phase of the Persian Wars.

Cimon drove the Persians out of the city of Eion in Thrace in 477–476 BC. After clearing pirates from the island of Scyros and putting down a rebellion on Naxos Cimon in 466 BC launched a bold attack on large Persian land and naval forces gathering at the Eurymedon River in Pamphylia. In the greatest victory of his career Cimon led the Athenian and Delian League forces to a crushing double victory over the Persians destroying the Persian fleet while heavily defeating their army.

Later Cimon expelled the Persians from the Thracian Chersonese and put down a revolt on Thasos. He was acquitted on a charge of bribery largely through the efforts of his half-sister Elpinice. In c.462 BC Cimon encouraged the Athenians to send military aid to the Spartans who were trying to put down a major revolt by the Helots in the wake of an earthquake which had heavily damaged Sparta. But the conservative Spartans became worried by the revolutionary democratic spirit of the Athenian troops and sent Cimon and his army back home to Athens.

War between Athens and Sparta soon followed this rebuff and Cimon as a prominent pro-Spartan advocate was ostracised from Athens for ten years. He was recalled in 451 BC to lead an Athenian attack against the Persians in Cyprus but he died at the Siege of Citium.

== Thucydides ==
Thucydides, son of Melesias, the leader of the anti-Periclean conservative party during the 440s BC, was a relative of Cimon and a member of the Philaid clan.

Thucydides, son of Olorus, the great historian of the Peloponnesian War was also a Philaid according to the biographer Plutarch who notes that his remains were returned to Athens and placed in Cimon's family vault and that his father's name, Olorus, was the same as Cimon's grandfather.

== Later Philaids ==
Lacedaimonius the son of Cimon was named after Lacedaimon, another name for Sparta. This was an indication of the admiration his father Cimon felt for the Spartans and their way of life. Lacedaimonius was one of the three Athenian commanders at the Battle of Sybota in 433 BC.

Epicurus the philosopher (341 BC–270 BC) was descended from Athenian settlers on the island of Samos and was of the Philaid clan. Eurydice of Athens, a descendant of Miltiades the Younger, married Ophellas the Macedonian who was ruler of Cyrene. After the death of Ophellas she became the wife of the Antigonid king Demetrius Poliorcetes, the famous 'besieger of cities', after he took control of Athens in 307 BC.
