= Cimon (disambiguation) =

Cimon or Kimon may refer to:

== People ==
- Cimon of Cleonae (8th or 6th century BCE), ancient Greek painter
- Cimon Coalemos (6th century BCE), ancient Olympic chariot-racer and father of Miltiades
- Cimon (510–450 BCE), ancient Greek statesmen and general of Athens
- Kimon Digenis (c. 1871–1945), general of the Greek Army
- Kimon Georgiev (1882–1969), Prime Minister of Bulgaria
- Kimon Nicolaïdes (1891–1938), American artist, educator and author
- Kimon Evan Marengo (1904–1988), British cartoonist
- Kimon Friar (1911–1993), Greek-American poet and translator
- Kimon Deligiannis (1914–unknown), Greek footballer
- Kimon Zografakis (1918–2004), Greek partisan in the Cretan resistance
- Kimon Kokorogiannis (born 1953), Greek basketball player
- Kimon Taliadoros (born 1968), Australian soccer player, sports commentator and businessman

== Other uses ==
- Cimon (robot), an AI head-shaped robot used in the International Space Station
- Cimon, in Roman mythology, father of Pero – see Roman Charity.
- Cimone, Italy
- Kimon, a Japanese demon gate direction, see Oni
- Kimon, a music video compilation in the Dir En Grey discography
- Kimon Xylotympou, a former Cypriot football club
- Kimon-class frigate, a frigate class for the Greek Navy
- Greek ship Kimon, multiple ships including:
  - Greek destroyer Kimon (1981)
  - Greek destroyer Kimon (D218)
