= Python =

Python may refer to:

== Snakes ==
- Pythonidae, a family of nonvenomous snakes found in Africa, Asia, and Australia
  - Python (genus), a genus of Pythonidae found in Africa and Asia
- Python (mythology), a mythical serpent

== Arts and entertainment ==
- Python (film), a 2000 horror film by Richard Clabaugh
- Monty Python or the Pythons, a British comedy group
  - Python (Monty) Pictures, a company owned by the troupe's surviving members

== Computing ==
- Python (programming language), a widely used high-level programming language
- Python, a native code compiler for CMU Common Lisp
- Python, the internal project name for the PERQ 3 computer workstation

== People ==
- Python of Aenus, 4th-century BCE student of Plato
- Python (painter) (c. 360–320 BCE), vase painter in Poseidonia
- Python of Byzantium, 4th-century BCE orator, diplomat of Philip II of Macedon
- Python of Catana, 4th-century BCE poet who accompanied Alexander the Great
- Python Anghelo (1954–2014), Romanian graphic artist

== Roller coasters ==
- Python (Efteling), in the Netherlands
- Python (Busch Gardens Tampa Bay), Florida, US, a defunct roller coaster
- Python (Coney Island, Cincinnati), US, a steel roller coaster
- Klondike Gold Mine, at Drayton Manor, Staffordshire, England, formerly called "The Python"

== Vehicles ==
- Python (automobile maker), an Australian car company
- Python (Ford prototype), a sports car

== Weaponry and war ==
- Python (missile), a series of Israeli air-to-air missiles
- Python (nuclear primary), a gas-boosted fission primary used in thermonuclear weapons
- Colt Python, a revolver
- Python (codename), a British nuclear war contingency plan
- Operation Python, Indian naval operation during the Indo-Pakistani War of 1971

== Other uses ==
- Python, a work written by philosopher Timon of Phlius

== See also ==
- Pithon, a commune in northern France
- Pyton, a Norwegian magazine
