= Nymphodorus =

Nymphodorus may refer to:

- Nymphodorus (physician)
- Nymphodorus of Abdera
