= Cresium =

Coordinates: 38°51′15″N 24°30′34″E

Cresium or Kresion (Ancient Greek: Κρήσιον), also known as Ctesium or Ktesion, was an ancient port town on the island of Skyros. Plutarch mentions the town as the location where Thessalian merchants were robbed of their merchandise, the robbery led, ultimately, to the intervention of Cimon in Skyros.
