= Boges =

5th-century BC Persian official and military commander

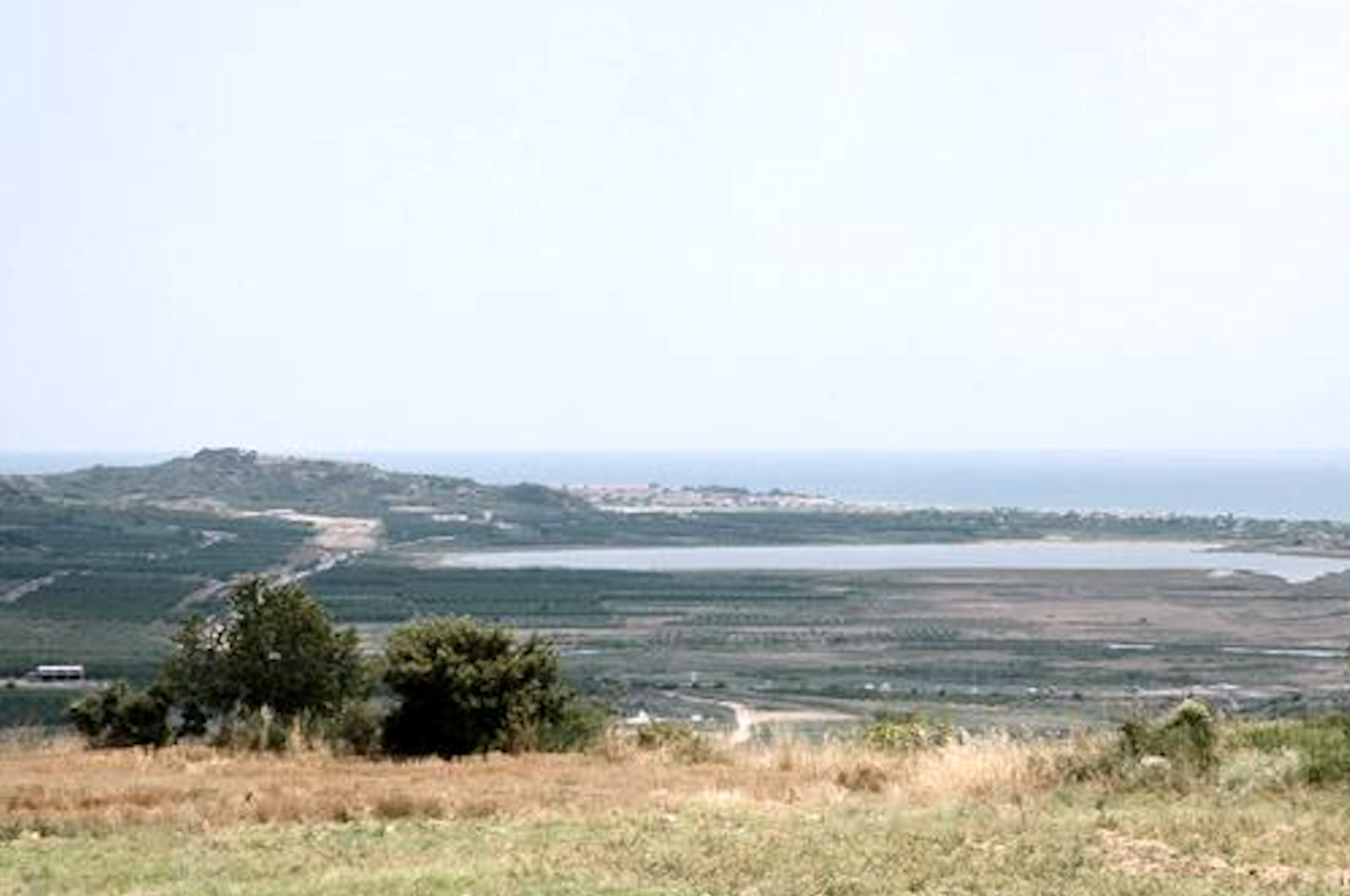
The ancient Persian fort at Eion (left) and the mouth of the Strymon (right), seen from Ennea Hodoi (Amphipolis).

Boges was a Persian official and military commander, who functioned as governor (hyparchos) of Eion in Thrace (Achaemenid satrapy of Skudra) under the King of Kings Xerxes I (r. 486–465 BC). According to Herodotus, following the Persian defeats at Plataea and Mycale, Boges refused to abandon Eion when it was besieged by the Athenians and Cimon (son of Miltiades) in 476/5. When he perhaps could have surrendered the town and marched out safely, Boges decided to endure till the end, as he wished not to suffer the ignominy of falling into the enemy’s hands. When the provisions of Eion had finally run out during the protracted siege, Boges built a large fire, killed his wife, children, concubines and servants, and threw them into the fire. He then reportedly collected all pieces of silver and gold that were stored in Eion and threw them into the river Strymon. He then threw himself onto the fire. Boges was highly honored by Xerxes I for his valiance and loyalty, and Herodotus not only reports the king’s high regard but also voices his own approval, praising the manner of Boges' death. When Herodotus wrote his Histories in the second half of the fifth century BC, Boges was still praised by the Persians for his deeds. The children of Boges who survived within the Achaemenid Empire were also greatly honoured by Xerxes I.

== Sources ==
- King, Carol J. (2017). Ancient Macedonia. Routledge. ISBN 978-0415827287.
- Kuhrt, Amélie; Sancisi-Weerdenburg, Helen (2006). "Boges". In Salazar, Christine F.; Landfester, Manfred; Gentry, Francis G. (eds.). Brill's New Pauly. Brill Online.
- Kuhrt, Amélie (2007). The Persian Empire: A Corpus of Sources from the Achaemenid Period. Routledge. ISBN 978-0415552790.
- Rehm, Ellen (2010). "The Impact of the Achaemenids on Thrace: A Historical Review". In Nieling, Jens; Rehm, Ellen (eds.). Achaemenid Impact in the Black Sea: Communication of Powers. Black Sea Studies. Vol. 11. Aarhus University Press. ISBN 978-8779344310.
- Shapiro, Susan O. (1996). "Herodotus and Solon". Classical Antiquity. 15 (2): 348–364. doi:10.2307/25011045. JSTOR 25011045.
