= Lacedaemonius =

5th-century BC Athenian general

Lacedaemonius (Greek: Λακεδαιμόνιος) (Note: The most ancient attestation of this word in Greek, referring as an ethnonym to the Spartans, is the Mycenaean Linear B 𐀨𐀐𐀅𐀖𐀛𐀍, ra-ke-da-mi-ni-jo, found on many tablets at Thebes, e.g. on the TH Fq 229 tablet.) was an Athenian general of the Philaid clan. He served Athens, notably in the naval Battle of Sybota against the Corinthians in 433 BC.

== Biography ==
Lacedaemonius was the son of Cimon, a pro-Sparta general and Athenian political figure, and Isodice who was the daughter of Euryptolemus I, a cousin of Pericles. He was a grandson of the famous Miltiades IV. An account cited that he had a twin called Oulius. He was also the brother of Miltiades V.

Lacedaemonius came from Lacedaemon, the contemporary name for the city state of Sparta. His father so admired the Spartans that as a sign of goodwill he named his son after their city. Lacedaemonius was also identified as the proxenos of the Spartans in Athens.

Accounts cited Lacedaemonius as one of the Athenian generals sent to aid Corcyra in its conflict with Corinth after an alliance agreement concluded in 433. This is part of the series of events that led to the Peloponnesian War. According to Plutarch, Lacedaemonius sailed with ten ships and was sent forth against his will. Lacedaemonius, who according to Thucydides was sent with 2 other generals: Diotimus (son of Strombichus), and Proteas (son of Epicles), was ordered not to engage with the Corinthians unless they attacked Corcyra. The Athenian fleet joined the Corcyraeans when the Corinthians finally invaded under Xenocleides.

A view, which had been advanced by Plutarch, held that giving Lacedaemonius command with a meager fleet for his campaign was an insult to the sons of Cimon due their sympathy for Sparta. Modern historians see Lacedaemonius appointment as a political move on the part of Pericles, who wanted to destroy political opposition by cementing his ties with the Cimonians. There are also those who propose that Lacedaemonius appointment, his mission, and the size of his fleet was part of a strategy of "minimal deterrence" against Corinth.

== Notes and references ==
Notes
