= Callias II =

5th-century BC Greek statesman, soldier and diplomat

Callias (Greek: Καλλίας, romanized: Kallias) was an Ancient Greek statesman, soldier and diplomat active in 5th century BC. He is commonly known as Callias II to distinguish him from his grandfather, Callias I, and from his grandson, Callias III, who apparently squandered the family's fortune.

== Life ==
Born to the wealthy Athenian family that provided slaves to the state-owned silver mine of Laurion, Callias was one of the richest men in Athens. He fought at the Battle of Marathon (490) in priestly attire. Plutarch relates that after the battle, an enemy soldier confused Callias for a king and showed him where a large quantity of gold had been hidden in a ditch. Callias is said to have killed the man and secretly taken the treasure, but rumour later spread of the incident, and comic poets gave his family the name Laccopluti, or "enriched by the ditch".

Around the time of the death of Miltiades, Callias offered to pay the debt that Cimon had inherited from his father in exchange for Cimon's sister Elpinice's hand in marriage, and Cimon agreed.

A supporter of Pericles, who was the effective leader of Athens during this period, Callias took on the role of diplomat and ambassador of Athens and of the Delian League. In about 461 BC, he made at least one journey as ambassador to Persian King Artaxerxes I.

Sometime after the death of Cimon, probably about 449 BC he went to Susa to conclude with Artaxerxes a peace treaty, which became known as the Peace of Callias. The treaty ended the Greco-Persian War and safeguarded the Greek city-states in Asia Minor from Persian attacks. Callias may also been responsible for peace treaties with Rhegion and Leontinoi, as well as the later peace treaty with Sparta that is known as the Thirty Years' Peace.

Callias' fate upon his return to Athens remains a mystery, and information about his later years remain only fragmentary. According to Demosthenes, he was fined fifty talents on his return to Athens. Other sources claim that the Athenians dedicated an altar of peace and voted special honours to Callias.

Callias' son Hipponicus was also a notable military leader was known as the "richest man in Greece".
