= Tisagoras =

Tisagoras (Ancient Greek: Τισαγόρας) may refer to the:

- A brother of Miltiades according to Cornelius Nepos. Cornelius Nepos describes Tisagoras as the brother of Miltiades who conducted Miltiades defense when he was put on trial in Athens after his failed expedition to Paros. Because Miltiades leg wound had become gangrenous and he could not speak in his own defense, Tisagoras represented him in court.
- A sculptor. Strabo wrote that there was a sculpture at Delphi depicting Heracles fighting the Lernaean Hydra. Tisagoras not only dedicated the offering but also crafted it. Both the Hydra and Heracles were made of iron, a material that makes such images difficult and labor-intensive to produce. According to Strabo, the work of Tisagoras was truly remarkable.
