= Python of Catana =

Greek poet

Python of Catana, Magna Graecia, was a dramatic poet of the time of Alexander, whom he accompanied into Asia, and whose army he entertained with a satyric drama, called Agen (Ἀγήν) when they were celebrating the Dionysia on the banks of the Hydaspes. The drama was in ridicule of Harpalus and the Athenians; fragments of it are preserved by Athenaeus. Identification of the poet with Python of Byzantium, the highly regarded orator in the service of Philip II, is unlikely.

== See also ==
- Glycera (courtesan)
- Harpalus
