= Eion =

Ancient Greek colony

Coordinates: 40°47′20″N 23°53′26″E

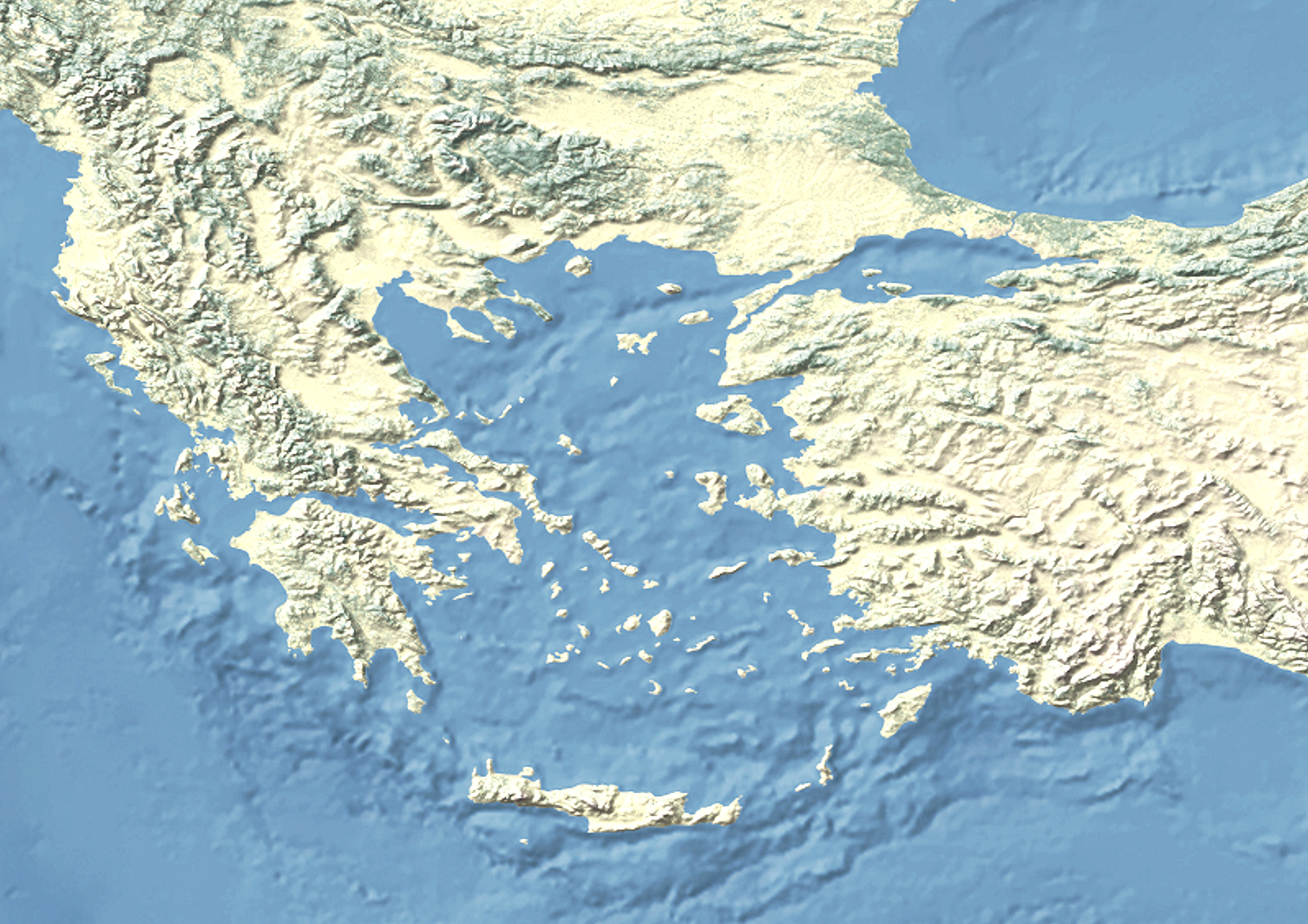
Location of Eion in modern Greece.

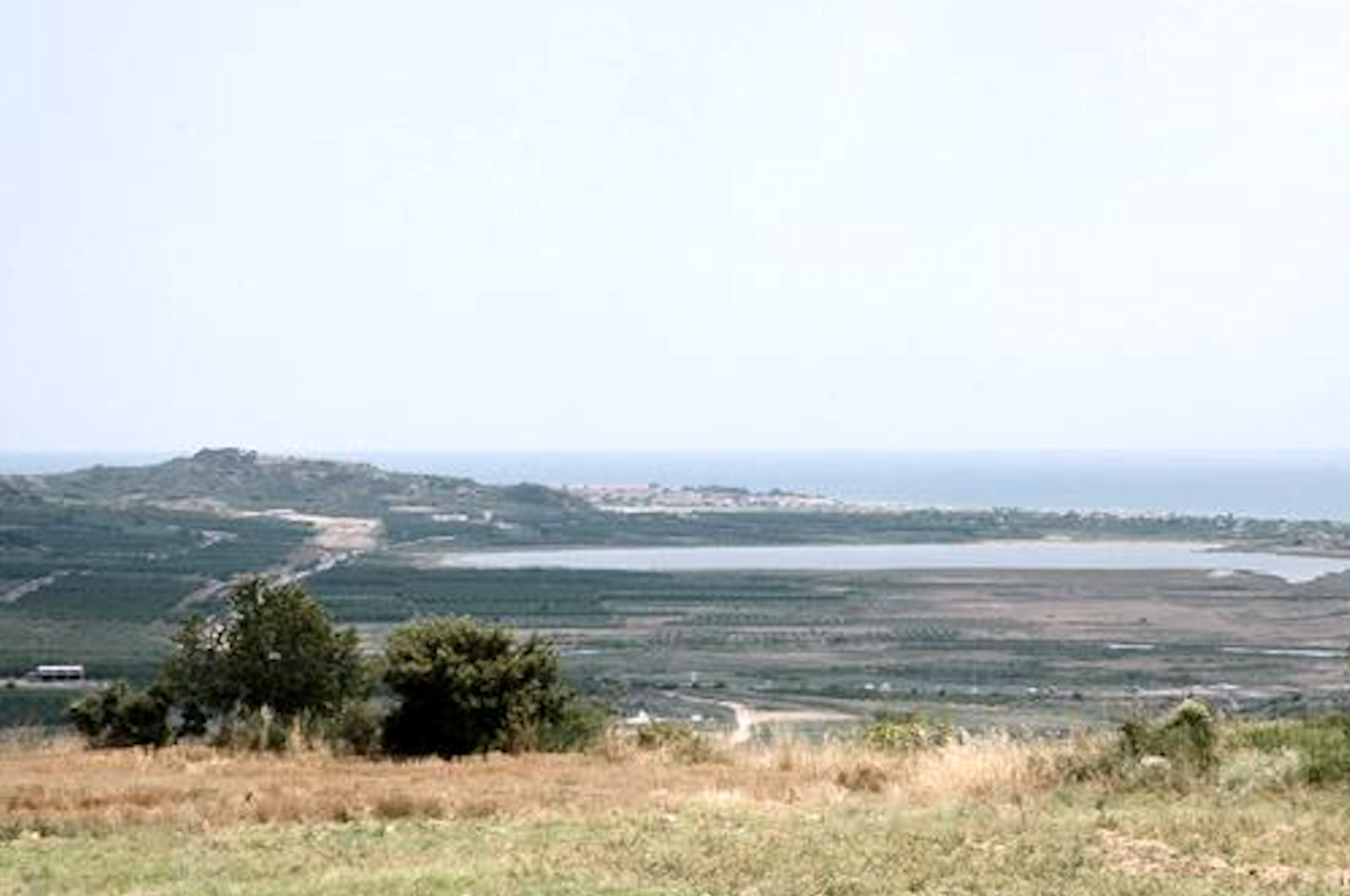
The ancient Persian fort at Eion (left) and the mouth of the Strymon (right), seen from Ennea Hodoi (Amphipolis).

Eion (Ancient Greek: Ἠϊών, Ēiṓn), one of two ancient cities named Chrysopolis, was an ancient Greek Eretrian colony in Thracian Macedonia specifically in the region of Edonis. It sat at the mouth of the Strymon River which flows into the Aegean from the interior of Thrace. It is referred to in Thucydides' History of the Peloponnesian War as a place of considerable strategic importance to the Athenians during the Peloponnesian War.

Athenians for the first time attempted to capture Eion in 497 BC during the Ionian Revolt, which was unsuccessful as the revolt ended with Persians re-establishing control over the Thrace, including Eion, and a Persian fortress meant for permanent stay was built there, probably in 492 BC. Eion functioned as one of the main Achaemenid cities in Thrace where food was stored for the Persian king Xerxes I and his great armies. Herodotus and Diodorus speak of Persian garrisons, of which the one at Eion was amongst them, which meant that its senior commander was apparently ethnically Persian. Xerxes had recalled most of the Persian troops from the area in the winter of 480/479 BC. It was then captured by the Delian League in 476 BC under the leadership of the Athenian general Cimon, the son of Miltiades the Younger, who started a siege on the city. Refusing Cimon's offer of an honorable withdrawal, the Persian commander Boges destroyed the treasure, killed his family, and committed suicide as the food ran out. Cimon turned the course of the River Strymon so that it flowed against the city walls, causing the mud brick fortifications to dissolve. The inhabitants were enslaved. The capture of Eion was the beginning of a military campaign undertaken by the newly formed Delian League, whose objective was to clear the Aegean Sea of Persian fleets and pirates in order to facilitate Athenian access to the Hellespont.

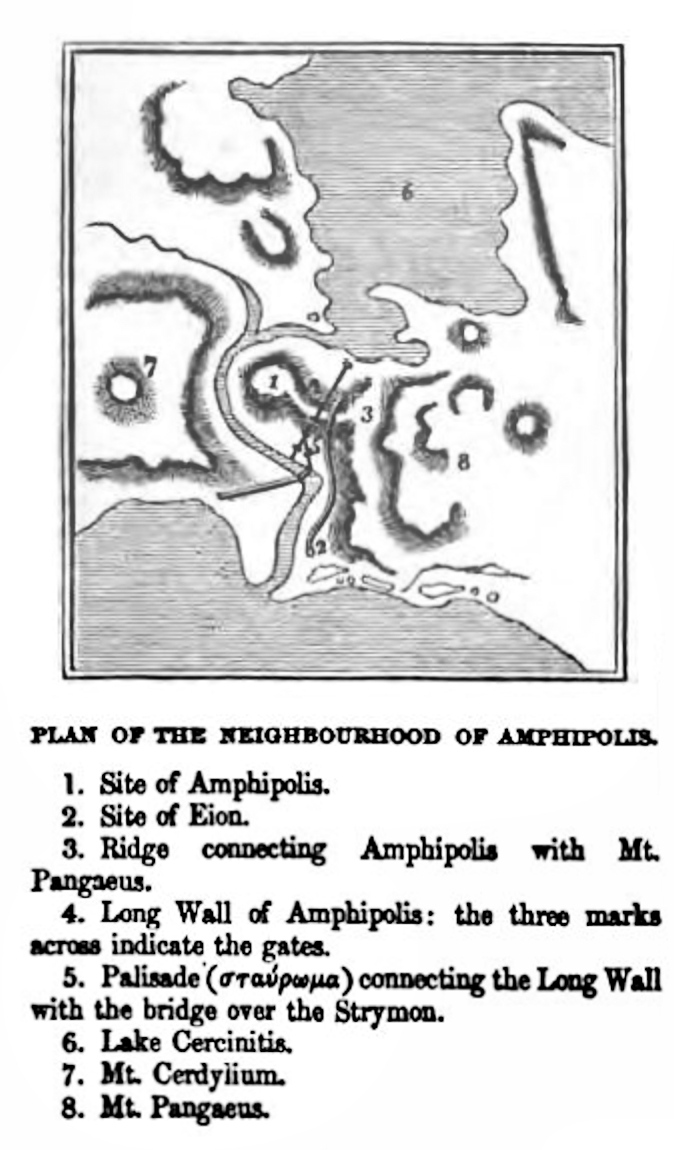
Plan and neighbourhood of Amphipolis, with location of Eion.

The nearby Athenian colony of Amphipolis was founded in 437 BC three miles up the Strymon River. The settlers, led by Hagnon, used Eion as their initial base of operations; and Eion functioned as the harbour of Amphipolis.

In 424 BC, during the Peloponnesian War, Eion was the site where the Athenian commander Aristides intercepted a Persian messenger named Artaphernes. The message, which was on its way to Sparta, was a letter from the Persian king addressing previous requests made to him by the Spartans.

Later in the war, in the winter of 424/423 BC, the Spartan general Brasidas captured Amphipolis with his Thracian allies. When he moved against Eion, however, he was unable to overcome the Athenian defenders, who were led by Thucydides, who had come from Thasos with his squadron in time to save it. Although he held Eion, Thucydides was subsequently ostracized by the Athenians for his failure to defend the more pivotal city of Amphipolis.

Eion was known in the early 19th century as Rendina, hence the earlier name Gulf of Rendina for the Strymonian Gulf. Whether its site was also that of Byzantine Chrysopolis (Χρυσούπολης) is disputed.

The location has been recovered since at least the 19th century, as William Martin Leake reported finding there extensive ruins of thick walls, constructed of small stones and mortar, among which appear many squared blocks in the Hellenic style, on the left bank of the Strymon. However, those ruins belong to the Byzantine period, and have been attributed to a town of the Lower Empire, Komitisse (Κομιτίσση), which the Italians converted into Contessa, siting on the site of Eion.
