= Greek ship Kimon =

Three ships of the Hellenic Navy have been named Kimon, after ancient Athenian admiral Kimon:

- Greek destroyer Kimon (1981), the former Fletcher-class destroyer USS Ringgold (DD-500); launched, 1942; served as Z-2 (D171) in the West German Navy, 1959–1981; acquired by the Hellenic Navy, 1981; stricken and scrapped, 1993
- Greek destroyer Kimon (D218), the former Charles F. Adams-class destroyer USS Semmes (DDG-18); launched, 1961; acquired by the Hellenic Navy, 1991; decommissioned, June 2004; scrapped, 2006
- Greek frigate Kimon, a Belharra-class frigate laid down 2022, commissioned in 2025.
