= Chrysopolis =

Chrysopolis (Greek: Χρυσόπολις or Χρυσοῦπολις, meaning "golden city"), can refer to:

- Chrysopolis (Bithynia), the ancient name of Üsküdar, an Asian suburb of Istanbul, Turkey
- Chrysopolis, California, a ghost town in Inyo County, California
- Chrysopolis (sidewheeler) a side-wheel steamboat that ran between Sacramento and San Francisco in the later 19th century
- Chrysopolis (Thrace), the medieval name of the ancient city of Eion at the mouths of the Strymon river
