= Elpinice =

5th-century BC Athenian noblewoman

Elpinice (Ancient Greek: Ἐλπινίκη Μιλτιάδου Λακιάδου, romanized: Elpinikē Miltiadou Lakiadou, flourished c. 510-450 BC) was a noblewoman of classical Athens. She is known from Plutarch's Life of Cimon, as well as Life of Pericles where she appears twice in political confrontations with the Athenian statesman. Part of the Cimonids (related to Cimon), she is recorded as having repeatedly defended and aided her brother Cimon in Plutarch's work. She appears to have faced scrutiny for her behavior as a woman in Athenian society, as Plutarch says people described her as "not very decorous" and Pericles rebuked her actions as an older woman.

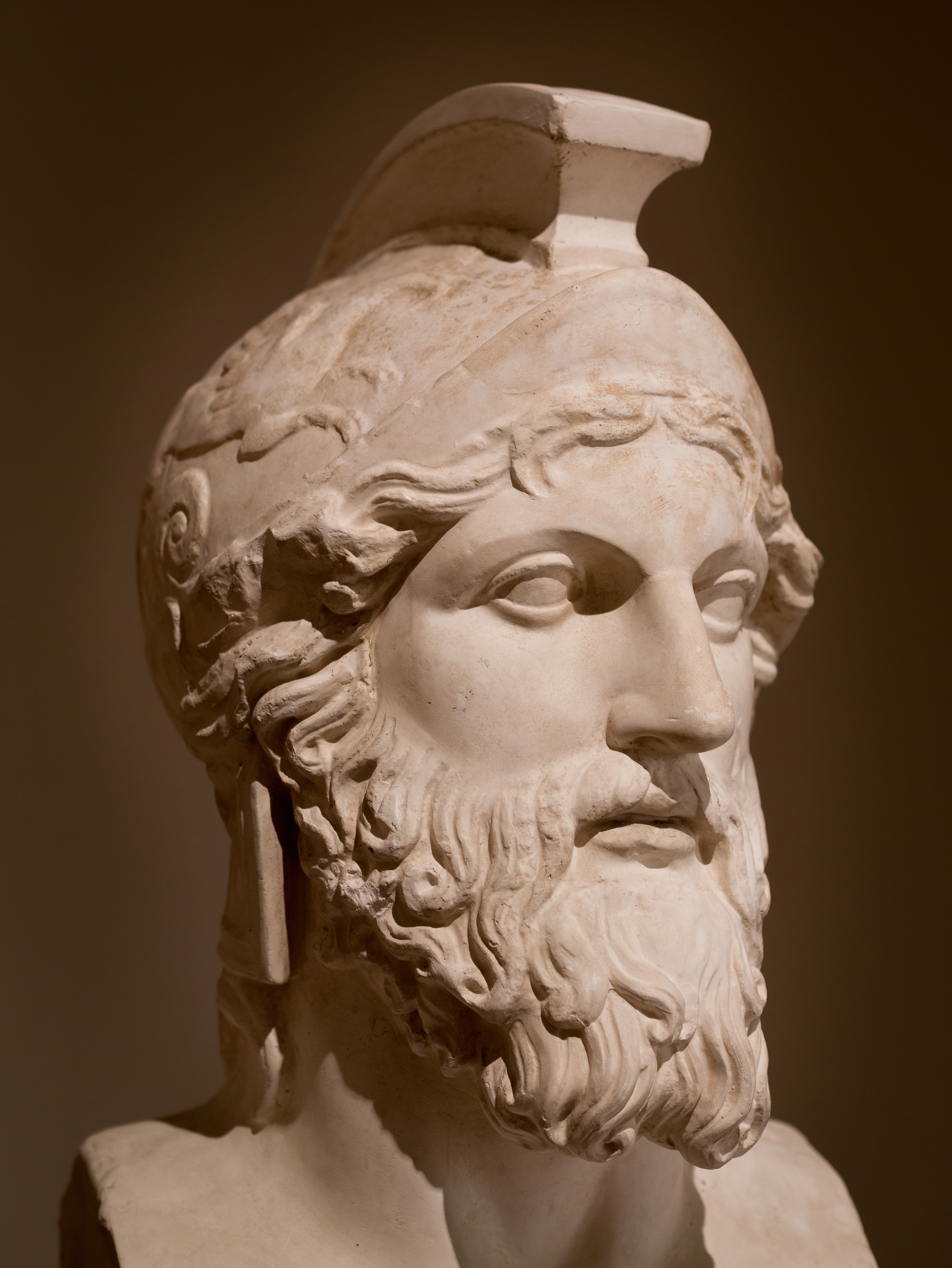
Miltiades the Younger, father of Elpinice

== Family ==
She was the daughter of Miltiades, tyrant of the Greek colonies on the Thracian Chersonese and Hegesipyle, daughter of King Olorus of Thrace. She was the sister of Cimon, an important Athenian political figure, and half-sister of Metiochus (eldest son of Miltiades, from a prior marriage). She is known from Plutarch's life of Pericles, where she appears twice in political confrontations with the Athenian statesman. At her death, she was buried with members of her own family by birth and not her husband's, displaying piety towards her blood family.

Herodes Atticus claimed his lineage from Miltiades from Elpinice and named his daughter after her.

== Marriage and romantic affiliations ==
Reconstruction of Polygnotus' Illiupersis by Carl Robert in 1892, zoomed in on the Laodike depiction, as it is said that Polygnotus used Elpinice's likeness for Laodike.

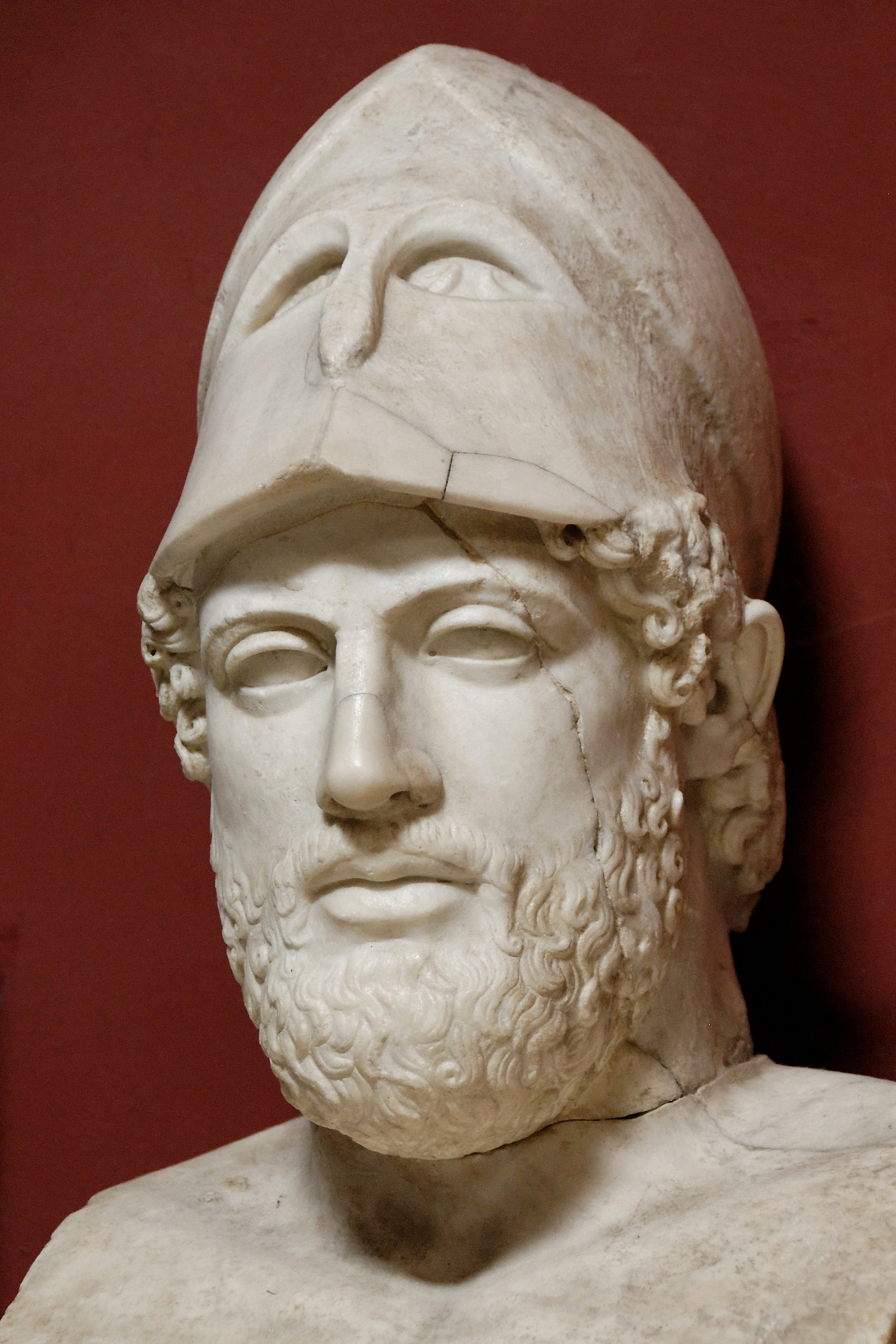
Pericles rebuked Elpinice for being an outspoken woman

Elpinice may have been married twice; first to her brother, Cimon, and later to a very wealthy Athenian called Callias II. Plutarch notes rumors of incestuous conduct between Cimon and Elpinice, and that it is unclear whether or not they were actually married. Athenian law allowed marriage between a brother and sister if they were not ὁμομήτριος (homometrios), which meant to be born from the same mother. This suggests that Elpinice and Cimon were only half-siblings, if their marriage occurred. Plutarch stated that a possible reason for the siblings' marriage was because Elpinice could not find a husband that matched her noble status due to their poverty, as their father was jailed for an unpaid fine and died when they were both young.

It is possible that Callias had made marriage to Elpinice the condition for paying, on Cimon's behalf, the fine which had been imposed upon their father Miltiades and for which Cimon had inherited responsibility. Callias and Elpinice probably married in the early 480s BC. By Callias, Elpinice was the mother of Hipponicus. Callias and Elpinice probably divorced after he was born.

Plutarch also mentions that Elpinice had "improper relations" with the artist Polygnotus of Thasos as his lover. He is said to have used her features in his work depicting the Trojan woman Laodice.

== Political and military associations ==
Miltiades was one of the major forces securing a victory in the Battle at Marathon during the Greco-Persian Wars. At that time, Elpinice was still a child and not of age. She would have left Athens during the battle.

Plutarch claims that Elpinice aided Cimon multiple times by negotiating with Pericles.

The first recorded instance of this is after Cimon was ostracized on account of him favoring Sparta. This was supposedly due to Pericles wielding his influence over the opinion of the people to sway them towards ostracizing Cimon, as he was one of Pericles' political adversaries. While ostracization required ten years of banishment, Cimon returned early to join the Athenians in battle against the Spartans after they attacked the city of Tanagra. This apparently altered many Athenians' opinion of Cimon, as there was a desire for him to return to Athens afterwards. Pericles noted this and recalled Cimon from ostracization, however Plutarch says that Pericles may not have made the decision to allow Cimon to return until Elpinice had met with him. Supposedly, Elpinice negotiated with Pericles and struck a deal between them by suggesting that he allow Cimon to return and have him take command of naval forces and foreign areas while Pericles ruled in Athens, therefore advocating both for Cimon's return to Athens and for his military career.

Later, Cimon was charged with treason for allegedly taking bribes from Alexander I, king of Macedonia and Pericles was set to serve on the committee against him in court. In response to this, Elpinice met with Pericles before the trial and requested that he aid her brother. Plutarch states that Pericles responded to her request by saying with a smile: "Elpinice, thou art an old woman, thou art an old woman, to attempt such tasks”. Despite this, Pericles only spoke to announce his exit at Cimon's trial, ultimately doing little harm to him.

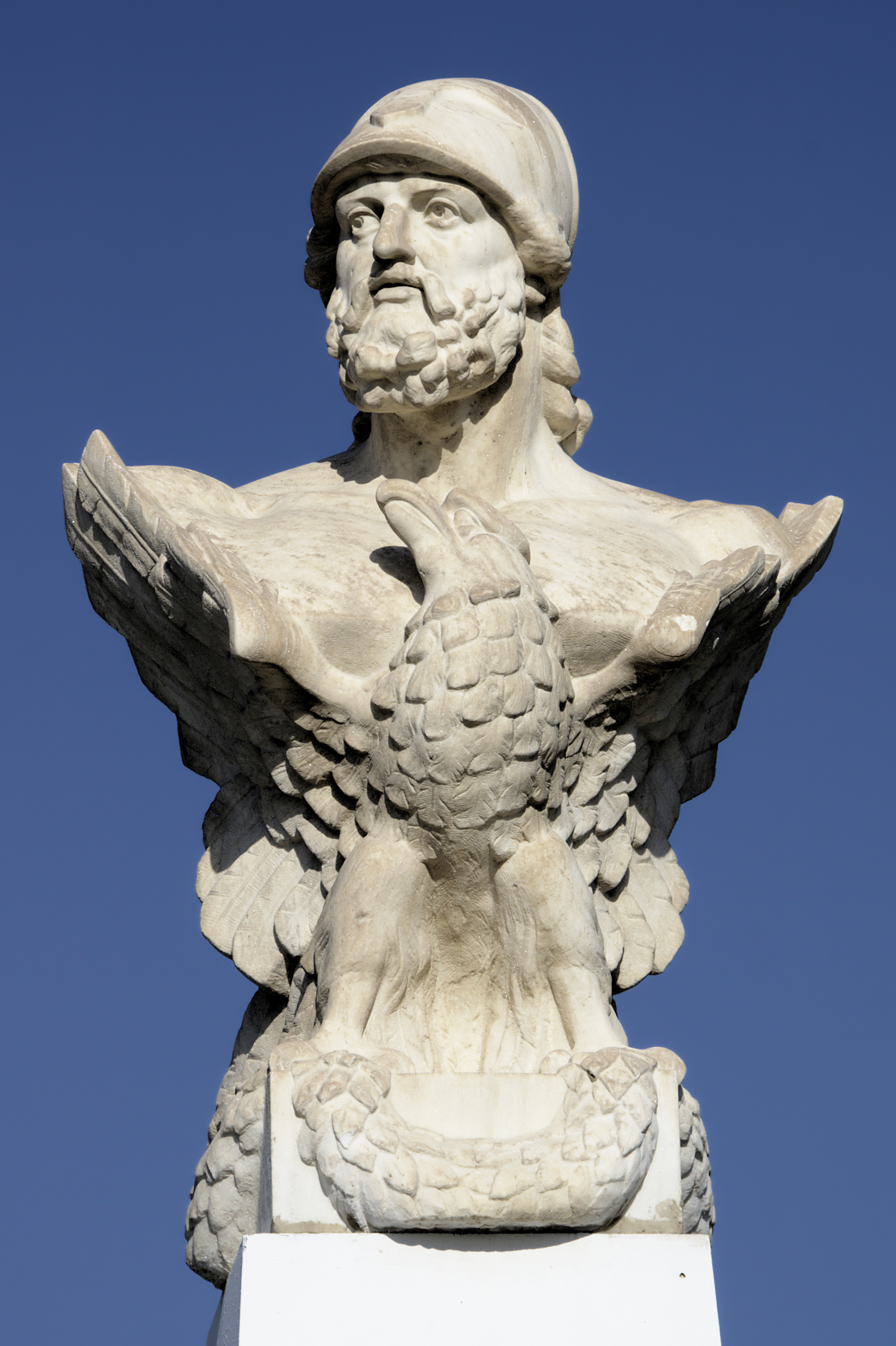
Cimon, brother of Elpinice

Although unrelated to Cimon, there is a third recorded example of Elpinice confronting Pericles. When the people of the island of Samos revolted against Athenian rule, Pericles pursued a war against them and punished them by demolishing their city walls, confiscating their ships and forcing them to pay a large fine. After returning to Athens, Pericles held a burial for the fallen soldiers. While everyone else present celebrated this and showered Pericles with praise, Elpinice said to him: "This is admirable in thee, Pericles, and deserving of wreaths, in that thou hast lost us many brave citizens, not in a war with Phoenicians or Medes, like my brother Cimon, but in the subversion of an allied and kindred city". With this comment, Elpinice points out that the battle was won over Athens' own people rather than against her true foreign enemies, such as the Phoenicians or Medes. Pericles rebuked her, quoting Archilochus and saying: "As an old woman you should not anoint yourself with oils". This is the second response Pericles makes that critiques Elpinice for her actions and age as a woman. Elpinice was one of the few women in antiquity who is shown to speak in public.
