= Creation (novel) =

1981 novel by Gore Vidal

- Cover of the first edition
- Author: Gore Vidal
- Language: English
- Genre: Historical novel
- Publisher: Random House
- Publication date: 1 January 1981
- Publication place: United States
- Media type: Print (Hardback and Paperback)
- Pages: 510 pp (first edition, hardback)
- ISBN: 0-394-50015-6 (first edition, hardback)
- OCLC: 7158597
- Dewey Decimal: 813/.54 19
- LC Class: PS3543.I26 C7

Creation is an epic historical fiction novel by Gore Vidal published in 1981. In 2002 he published a restored version, reinstating four chapters that a previous editor had cut and adding a brief foreword explaining what had happened and why he had restored the cut chapters.

== Plot summary ==
The story follows the adventures of a fictional "Cyrus Spitama", an Achaemenid Persian diplomat of the 6th/5th century BCE who travels the known world comparing the political and religious beliefs of various empires, kingdoms and republics of the time. Over the course of his life, he meets many influential philosophical figures of his time, including Zoroaster, Socrates, Anaxagoras, the Buddha, Mahavira, Lao Tsu, and Confucius. Though vehemently identifying himself as a Persian and speaking disparagingly of the Greeks, he is half-Greek himself – having had a formidable Greek mother.

Cyrus, who is the grandson of Zoroaster and who survives his murder, grows up at the Achaemenid court as a quasi-noble, and becomes a close friend of his schoolmate Xerxes. Because of Cyrus' talent for languages, the Achaemenid King, Darius I, sends him as an ambassador to certain kingdoms in India, and in fact as a spy gathering information for Darius' intended invasion and conquest of the Gangetic Plain. Cyrus becomes interested in the many religious theories he encounters there, but being a worldly courtier fails to be impressed with the Buddha and his concept of Nirvana. After coming to power, Cyrus' former schoolmate, now King Xerxes I, sends Cyrus to China, where he spends several years as a captive and "honored guest" in several of the warring states of the Middle Kingdom, and spends a great deal of time with Confucius – who, unlike the Buddha, seeks "To rectify the world rather than withdraw from it". Upon returning home, Cyrus witnesses the defeat of Xerxes and the end of the Greco-Persian wars. Cyrus then goes into retirement, but is called upon by Xerxes' successor, Artaxerxes I, to serve as ambassador to Athens and witness to the secret peace treaty between Pericles and himself.

The story is related in the first person as recalled to his Greek great-nephew Democritus. Cyrus's recollection is said to be motivated in part by his desire to set the record straight following the publication by Herodotus of an account of the Greco-Persian wars.

== Major themes ==
Vidal evokes a theme which Robert Graves had previously explored, a skepticism of the reported facts and interpretations of our understanding of history as reported by the winners of its battles. The story features a rather amusingly sarcastic treatment of the pretensions to glory of Classical Golden Age of Athens. In the parts of the book that comment on history, Vidal makes obvious use of the Histories of Herodotus.

As noted in Vidal's own introduction, it can be considered a "crash course" in comparative religion, as during the story, the hero sits down with each of the religious/philosophical figures (apart from Socrates, whom Spitama immensely dislikes) and discusses their views.

== Reception ==
Paul Theroux, in a contemporary review for The New York Times, took issue with Vidal's omission of "anything like plain vulgar domesticity", opining that its preoccupation with "the sort of patrician name-dropping that mars so many historical epics" made the book a good novel rather than "a great one".

Stan Persky, writing for Salon, referred to the book as a "very under-rated tale".
