= Ophellas =

4th century BC Macedonian governor of Cyrenaica

- Ὀφέλλας
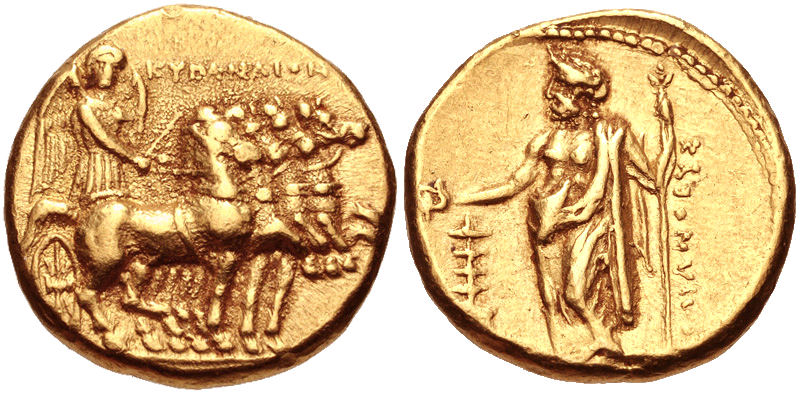
- Gold stater (322–313 BC) of the Cyrene mint, struck under Ophellas as Ptolemaic governor. Nike depicted left, Zeus Ammon depicted right.
- Born: Pella Macedon
- Died: November 308 BC; North Africa, near Carthaginian territory
- Cause of death: Killed by Agathocles of Syracuse
- Spouse(s): Euthydice, a descendant of the Athenian general Miltiades
- Children: Miltiades (son)
- Military career
- Allegiance: Macedonian Empire; Argead Dynasty; Ptolemaic Dynasty
- Rank: Trierarch; General; Governor of Cyrene
- Conflicts: Wars of Alexander the Great; Cyrenaean expedition (322 BC); Agathocles' expedition against Carthage (309/308 BC)

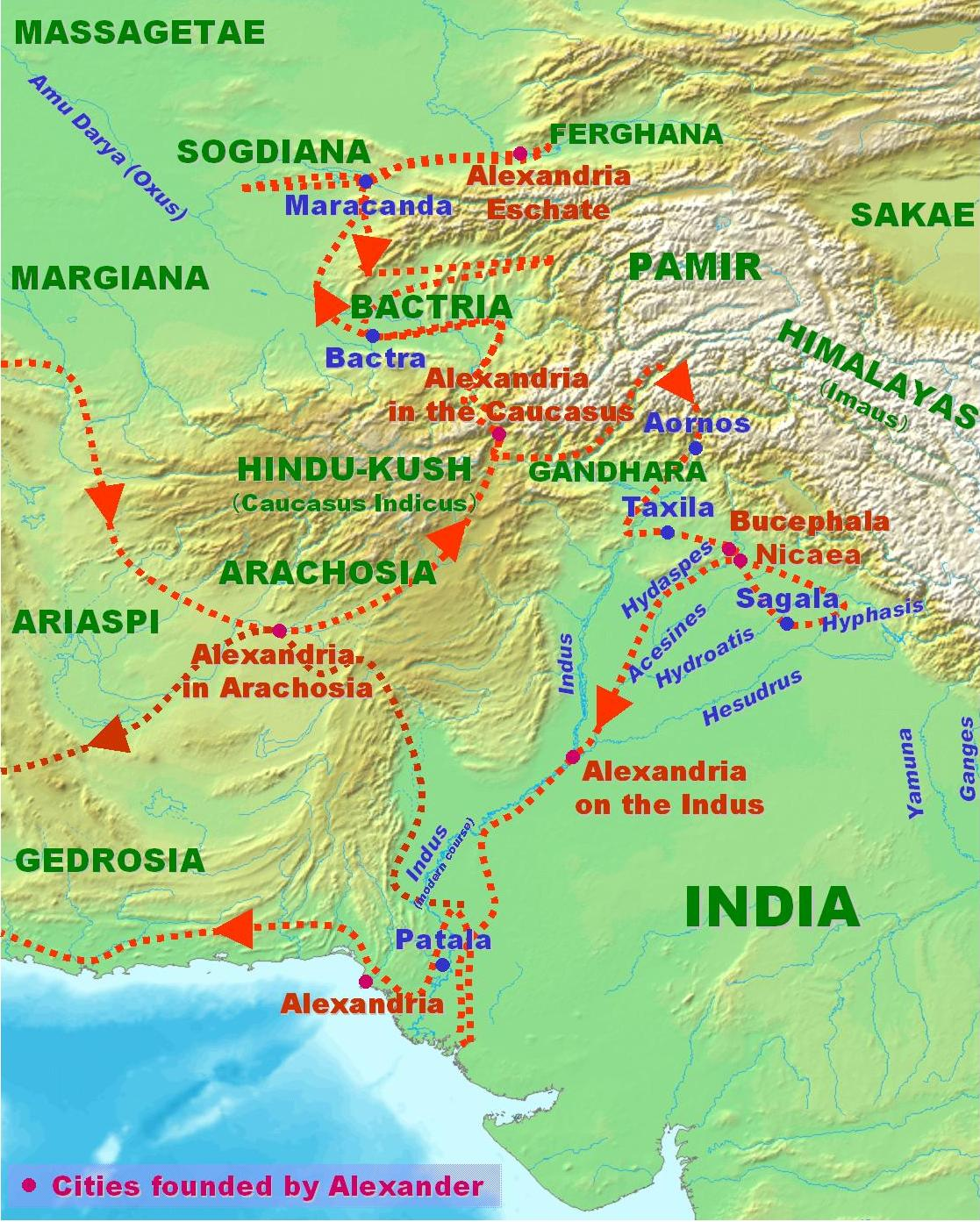
Ophellas was part of Alexander's fleet that sailed down the Indus in 326 BC.

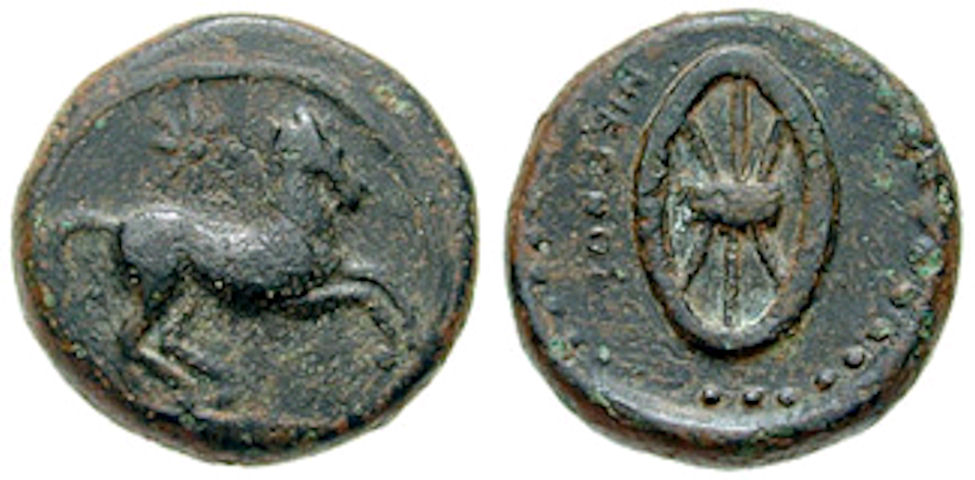
Cyrene coin struck under Ophellas as Ptolemaic governor. Circa 322–313 BC. Æ 19mm (8.14 gm). Horse running right; star above / NIKWNOS, six-spoked wheel.

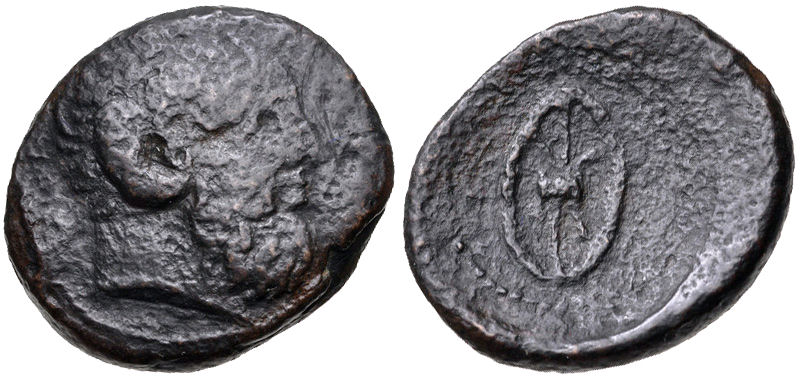
Cyrene coin struck under Ophellas as Ptolemaic governor, first reign, circa 322–313 BC. Æ Unit (25mm, 11.14 g, 9h). Head of Ammon right / Wheel in perspective.

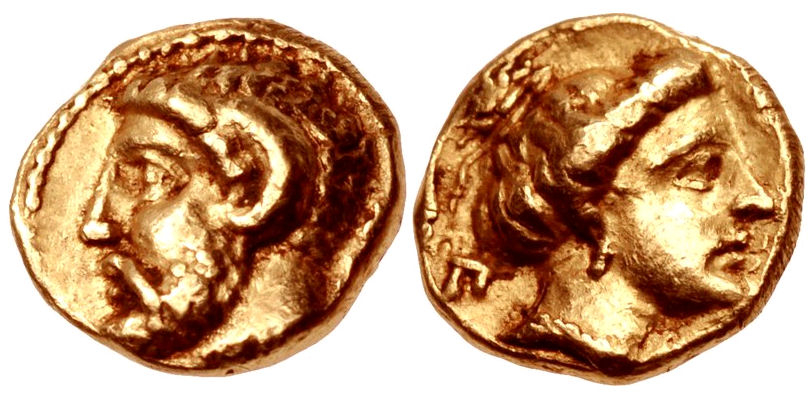
Ophellas, Ptolemaic Governor. Second reign, 312–309 BC. AV Tenth Stater (7mm, 0.86 g, 7h). Polianthes, magistrate. Head of Zeus Ammon left; [KY to right] / Head of female (Nike or Libya) right, hair tied in bun above, with ties handing below; Π-[O] flanking neck.

Ophellas or Ophelas (Ancient Greek: Ὀφέλλας or Ὀφέλας; fl. c. 326–308 BC) was an ancient Macedonian soldier and politician, born in Pella. He served as a trierarch under Alexander the Great, accompanied Ptolemy I to Egypt after Alexander's death, and acted as Ptolemaic governor of Cyrene from around 322 BC until his death in 308 BC. His father's name was Seilenus.

== Career under Alexander ==
Ophellas is first mentioned as a trierarch (commander of a trireme) of Alexander's fleet on the Indus in 326 BC. Of his earlier career under Alexander nothing else is known.

== Governor of Cyrenaica (322–308 BC) ==
After the death of Alexander, he followed the fortunes of Ptolemy I Soter, by whom he was sent, in 322 BC, at the head of a considerable army, to take advantage of the civil war which had broken out in Cyrenaica. This he successfully accomplished.

Ophellas defeated the Cyrenaeans who had sided with Thibron, captured Thibron himself, and handed him over to the people of Teucheira to be tortured and executed. Ptolemaic control over Cyrene itself and its dependencies was established and Ophellas remained as its governor. The character of the new pro-Ptolemaic regime at Cyrene is illuminated by a lengthy constitutional document from Cyrene, preserved on stone, whose precise date remains controversial.

Ophellas' later career is poorly attested and somewhat obscure. Justin styles Ophellas "rex Cyrenarum," king of Cyrene, while the Suda refers to him as "Kurênaiou dunastou," dynast of Cyrene. He married Eurydice of Athens, daughter of Miltiades and a descendant of the famous Athenian general of the same name, and appears to have maintained friendly relations with Athens. By her he had a son named Miltiades. His name does not appear in the accounts of the Cyrenaean revolt of 313 BC, which was rapidly suppressed by Ptolemy, and he is not heard of again until 309/8 BC.

== Alliance with Agathocles and death (309/8–308 BC) ==
In 309/8 BC, Agathocles of Syracuse, engaged in his war against the Carthaginians in North Africa, sent an envoy to Cyrene to propose an alliance. Agathocles promised to cede to him whatever conquests their combined forces might make in Africa, reserving only Sicily for himself, if Ophellas would join the campaign against Carthage. Ophellas agreed and gathered a powerful army from the homeland of his wife Eurydice, where many citizens felt disgruntled after having lost their voting rights. Notwithstanding all the natural obstacles which presented themselves on his route, he succeeded in reaching the Carthaginian territories after a toilsome and perilous march of more than two months' duration. The Cyrenacian and Syracusan armies encamped near each other. Ophellas was received by Agathocles with every demonstration of friendship and Ophellas went so far as to adopt Agathocles as a son.

The alliance was short-lived. According to Polyaenus, Agathocles, knowing of Ophellas's fondness for boys, had sent his own son Heracleides as a hostage and distraction, instructing him to resist Ophellas's advances for a few days in order to keep him off his guard. in November 308, when the larger part of Ophellas's soldiers had dispersed to forage for food and fodder, Agathocles summoned his own troops, accused Ophellas of plotting against him, and led his army against the Cyrenaean camp. Ophellas, stunned by the sudden attack and with too few men remaining to mount an adequate defense, died fighting. Orosius records that he was "deceived by the flattery and wiles of Agathocles and slain." His leaderless army laid down its arms and was absorbed into Agathocles' forces, who now had sufficient strength to defeat the Carthaginians in a subsequent engagement.

Ptolemy exercised direct control over Cyrene after the assassination of Ophellas. Shortly after Ptolemy declared himself king (c.305 BC), the Cyrenaeans rebelled. Magas, Ptolemy's stepson, reconquered Cyrene c.300 BC and subsequently served as its governor before independence from Ptolemy II Philadelphus and becoming king in 276.
