= Eurydice of Athens =

Ancient Athenian patrician woman

Eurydice (Greek: Εὐρυδίκη ἡ Ἀθηναία) was an Athenian woman of a family descended from Miltiades.

She was first married to the Macedonian commander Ophellas, the conqueror and ruler of Cyrene, and after his death returned to Athens, where she married Demetrius I of Macedon, on occasion of his first visit to that city. She is said to have had by him a son called Corrhabus.
