= Aristion (physician) =

Ancient Greek surgeon

Aristion (Ancient Greek: Ἀριστίων) was a surgeon of ancient Greece, probably belonging to the Alexandria School of Medicine. He was the son of Pasicrates, who belonged to the same profession. Nothing is known of the events of his life; with respect to his date, he may be conjectured to have lived in the second or first century BC, as he lived after Nymphodorus, and before Heliodorus.
