= Battle of Sybota =

Battle during the Peloponnesian War (433 BC)

- Part of the prelude to the Peloponnesian War
| Date | 433 BCE |
| Location | Off Corcyra |
| Result | Indecisive |

Belligerents
| Korkyra; Athens | Korinth |

Commanders and leaders
| Mikiades; Aisimides; Eurybatos; Lakedaimonios; Diotimos; Proteas | Xenokleides |

Strength
| 110 Corcyraean ships, 10 Athenian ships | 150 ships |

Casualties and losses
| 70 ships destroyed, 1,000+ captured, many killed | 30 ships destroyed, many killed |

The Battle of Sybota (Ancient Greek: Σύβοτα) took place in 433 BC between Corcyra (modern Corfu) and Corinth. It was one of the immediate catalysts for the Peloponnesian War.

== History ==
Corinth had been in dispute with Corcyra, an old Corinthian colony which no longer wanted to remain under Corinthian influence (see Affair of Epidamnus for background). Corcyra, which had the third largest navy in Greece at the time, allied itself with Athens, an enemy of Corinth (as Corinth was allied with Sparta). Athens sent ten ships to Corcyra to reinforce the Corcyraean fleet, with instructions not to fight the Corinthian fleet unless they attempted to land on the island. Corinth, meanwhile, assembled a fleet of ships under the command of Xenoclides and prepared to sail to Corcyra.

Corcyra gathered a fleet under Miciades, Aisimides and Eurybatus, who made the Sybota islands their base of operations. The Athenian commanders, Lacedaimonius (the son of Cimon), Diotimus, and Proteas, sailed with them. Corcyra had 110 ships, plus the additional 10 provided by Athens, while Corinth had 150 ships. When the Corinthian ships arrived, the Corcyraeans formed their line of battle, with the Athenians on the right and their own ships making up the rest of the line in three squadrons. The Corinthian ships were lined up with the Megarians and Ambraciots on the right, the Corinthians on the left, and the remainder of their allies in the centre. Both sides fought with hoplites on their ships, along with archers and javelin-throwers, in a manner Thucydides calls "old-fashioned." Instead of ramming and sinking the other ships, both sides attempted to board their opponents' ships and fight what was essentially a land battle at sea. The Athenian ships, although they were part of the line, did not at first join the battle, as the Corinthians had not attempted to land.

The Corcyraean ships on the left routed the Corinthian right wing, chasing them all the way back to their camp on the coast, which they then burned. The Corinthian left wing, however, was more successful, and the Athenians were forced to come to the aid of their allies. Despite the Athenian intervention, the Corinthians were victorious, and sailed through the wreckage of defeated ships often killing survivors rather than taking prisoners (including, although they did not know it, some of their own allies who had been defeated on the right-wing). They did not kill everyone, however, and captured a number of prisoners.

The Corcyraeans and Athenians headed back to Corcyra to defend the island, but when the Corinthians arrived, they almost immediately retreated, as 20 more Athenian ships under the command of Glaucon were on their way. The next day, the new Athenian ships threatened a second battle if the Corinthians attempted to land on Corcyra. The Corinthians retreated completely rather than risk another battle. Both the Corinthians and Corcyraeans claimed victory, the Corinthians having won the first battle, and the Corcyraeans having avoided a Corinthian occupation of their island.

Soon after this battle, the Athenians and Corinthians fought again at the Battle of Potidaea, leading to a formal declaration of war from Sparta.

=== See also ===
- Diodorus Siculus
- Plutarch
- Thucydides, History of the Peloponnesian War
- Xenophon, Hellenica
- Aristophanes, Lysistrata
