= Cimon of Cleonae =

Ancient Greek painter

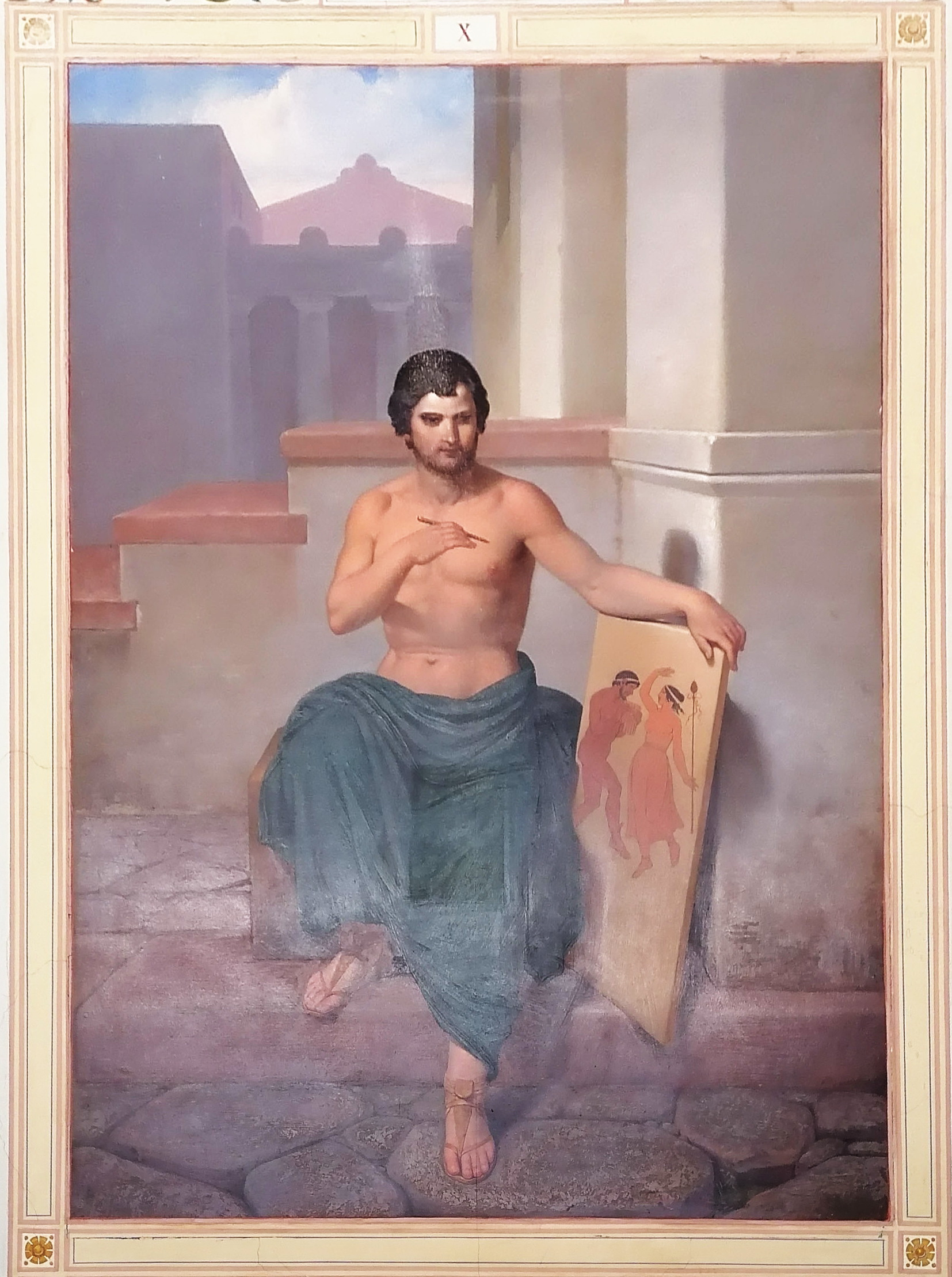
Cimon at the fresco in the Hermitage (19th century)

Cimon of Cleonae was an early painter of ancient Greece. He was said to have introduced great improvements in drawing. He represented figures, according to Pliny (XXXV, 56), "out of the straight", and he developed ways of representing faces looking back, up, or down; he also made the joints of the body clear, emphasized veins, worked out folds and doublings in garments (according to Pliny). Pliny also said Cimon of Cleonae's attention to detail and accuracy to life was so great, that he was famously able to dispense with what had always been the universal custom of affixing the name of generals to their portraits, since they were so readily recognizable. All these improvements may be traced in the drawing of early Greek red-figured vases.

Also mentioned by Claudius Aelianus (Various History. VIII, 8).

There is some uncertainty concerning whether Cimon of Cleonae lived in the 8th century BC or the 6th century BC.
