= Heraclides of Aenus =

Greek assassin and student of Plato

Heraclides of Aenus (Greek: Ἡρακλείδης Αἴνιος) was one of Plato's students. Around 360 BC, he and his brother Python assassinated Cotys I, the ruler of Thrace.
