= Peace of Callias =

Possible Greco-Persian treaty (c. 449 BC)

The Peace of Callias is a purported peace treaty that supposedly was established around 449 BCE between the Delian League (led by Athens) and the Achaemenid Empire and ended the Greco-Persian Wars. The peace would then be the first compromise treaty between Achaemenid Persia and a Greek polis.

The peace was negotiated by Callias, an Athenian politician. Persia had continually lost territory to the Greeks after the end of Xerxes I's invasion in 479 BC. The exact date of the treaty is debated, but it is usually placed after the Battle of the Eurymedon (469 or 466) or the Battle of Cypriot Salamis (450).

If it existed, the Peace of Callias gave autonomy to the Ionian states in Asia Minor, prohibited the encroachment of Persian satrapies within three days march of the Aegean coast and prohibited Persian ships from the Aegean. Athens also agreed not to interfere with Persia's possessions in Asia Minor, Cyprus, Libya or Egypt. Athens had at the time lost a fleet, which was aiding an Egyptian revolt against Persia.

== Doubts about existence ==
Knowledge of the Peace of Callias comes from references by the 4th-century BC orators Isocrates and Demosthenes, as well as by the historian Diodorus. The 4th-century BCE historian Theopompus deemed it a fabrication by arguing that the inscription of the treaty was a fake since the lettering that was used in it had not come into practice until half a century after the treaty was purported to have been agreed. Recent scholars doubt Theopompus's argument since the lettering that was used has been found in other inscriptions that are dated before the treaty was purported to have been agreed.

If it was concluded, its importance is disputed. Thucydides does not mention it, but Herodotus states something that may reasonably be construed as supporting its existence, as does Plutarch, who thinks that it either was signed after the Battle of the Eurymedon (466 BC) or was never signed at all.

== Aftermath ==
In any case, there seems to have been some agreement reached ending hostilities with Persia after 450/449, which allowed Athens to deal with the new threats from the other Greek city-states such as Corinth and Thebes, as well as Euboea, which rebelled from the Delian League shortly afterward. The conflicts may have arisen when Athenian 'allies' felt that there was no longer a justification for the Delian League, which had developed from the Spartan-led Hellenic League, which defeated Xerxes I's invasion, as Persia was apparently no longer a threat. Since Athens demanded more and more tribute and exerted more political and economic control over its allies, the league became more of a true empire, and many of Athens's allies began to rebel. Although Callias was also responsible for the Thirty Years' Peace with Sparta in 446 to 445 BC, the growing Athenian threat eventually led to the Peloponnesian War.

Fighting between the Greeks and the Persians subsided after 450, but Persia continued to meddle in Greek affairs and was to become instrumental in securing a Spartan victory during the Peloponnesian War.

Nonetheless, the treaty's existence has remained a controversial topic among historians and scholars.

== See also ==
- List of treaties
- Creation, 1981 historical novel by Gore Vidal in which the Peace of Callias provides a background
