= Cimon Coalemos =

6th-century BC Athenian aristocrat, father of Miltiades

Cimon Coalemos (Ancient Greek: Κίμων Κοάλεμος), was a renowned ancient Olympic chariot-racer of the 6th century BC.

== Biography ==
Cimon, called "Coalemos" (ancient Greek Κοάλεμος, Koàlemos, "booby"), son of Stesagoras, was a member the Athenian clan of Philaidae, step-brother of Miltiades the Elder and father of Stesagoras, both tyrants of the Thracian Chersonese (now the Gallipoli Peninsula).

Cimon was a well-known chariot race organizer, winning three consecutive times the chariot race, one of the most important competitions of the Ancient Olympic Games. In fact, the renown of the victory in the chariot race was given to the organizer of the team, who was funding the chariot, breeding the horses and hiring the charioteer.

Banned from Athens for political reasons, Cimon was forgiven and called back to his homeland by the tyrant Peisistratos since he dedicated to the tyrant his second victory at the Olympic Games, but when, four years later, he won again the chariot race, the envious tyrant sons, Hippias and Hipparchus, murdered him in a night ambush.

We know from Herodotus that Cimon Coalemus was buried across the road called “Through the Holloon" outside Athens, close to his mares that won the three Olympic prizes.

Cimon Coalemos was the father of Miltiades and the grandfather of Cimon, two of the most important strategoi of Athens.

== Bibliography ==
- Herodotus, Histories
- Plutarch, Life of Cimon
- Pomeroy, Sarah B. (2002). Spartan Women. Oxford University Press. ISBN 0-19-513-066-9.
