= Nymphodorus (physician) =

Nymphodorus, (Greek: Νυμφόδωρος; 3rd century BC), a Greek physician, who must have lived in or before the 3rd century BC, as he is mentioned by Heraclides of Tarentum. He was celebrated for the invention of a machine for the reduction of dislocations, called glossokomon (Greek: γλωσσόκομον), which was afterwards somewhat modified by Aristion, and of which a description is given by Oribasius. He is mentioned by Celsus along with several other eminent surgeons.
