= Python of Aenus =

Ancient Greek philosopher

Python of Aenus (/ˈpaɪθɒn, ən/; Greek: Πύθων Αἴνιος; fl. 4th-century BC) was a Greek philosopher and a former student of Plato. Around 360 BC, he and his brother Heraclides assassinated Cotys I, the ruler of Thrace.

Based on Demosthenes's Against Aristocrates, Python of Aenus was identified as Python of Byzantium, a Greek statesman. However, it is highly unlikely that both names are attributed to the same person.
