= Python of Byzantium =

Ancient Greek statesman and former student of Isocrates

Python of Byzantium (Greek: Πύθων ὁ Βυζάντιος) was an ancient Greek statesman and former student of Isocrates. In 346 BC, he appears to have participated in negotiations at Pella that resulted in the Peace of Philocrates. In 343 BC, Python represented Philip II of Macedon in Athens with an offer to alter the overall treaty. Hegesippus remarked that Python oratorically adhered to the instructions of his teachers in Athens (implying that Isocrates was a supporter of Macedon since he retained some influence over Python). Based on Demosthenes's Against Aristocrates, Python of Byzantium was identified with Python of Aenus the latter of which killed King Cotys I of the Odrysian Kingdom. However, it is highly unlikely that both names are attributed to one individual.
