= Nymphodorus of Abdera =

5th-century BC citizen of Abdera, brother-in-law of king Sitalces of Thrace

Nymphodorus of Abdera (Greek: Νυμφόδωρος Αβδηρίτης; c. 450– c. 400 BC) was a citizen of Abdera, Thrace whose sister married Sitalces, a king of Thrace. The Athenians, who had previously regarded Nymphodorus as their enemy, made him their Proxenos in 431 BC, and, through his mediation, obtained the alliance of Sitalces, for which they were anxious, and conferred the freedom of their city on Sadocus, Sitalces' son. Nymphodorus also brought about a reconciliation between the Athenians and Perdiccas II, king of Macedon, and persuaded them to restore to him the town of Therma, which they had taken in 432 BC. In 430 BC, Nymphodorus aided in the seizure, at Bisanthe, of Corinthian Aristeus and the other ambassadors, who were on their way to ask aid of the Persian king against the Athenians.
