= Olorus =

6th-century BC king of Thrace

Olorus (Greek: Ὄλορος) was the name of a king of Thrace. His daughter Hegesipyle married the Athenian statesman and general Miltiades, who defeated the Persians at the Battle of Marathon in 490 BC.
