= Miltiades =

Athenian statesman and general (c. 550–489 BC)

- Μιλτιάδης Κίμωνος
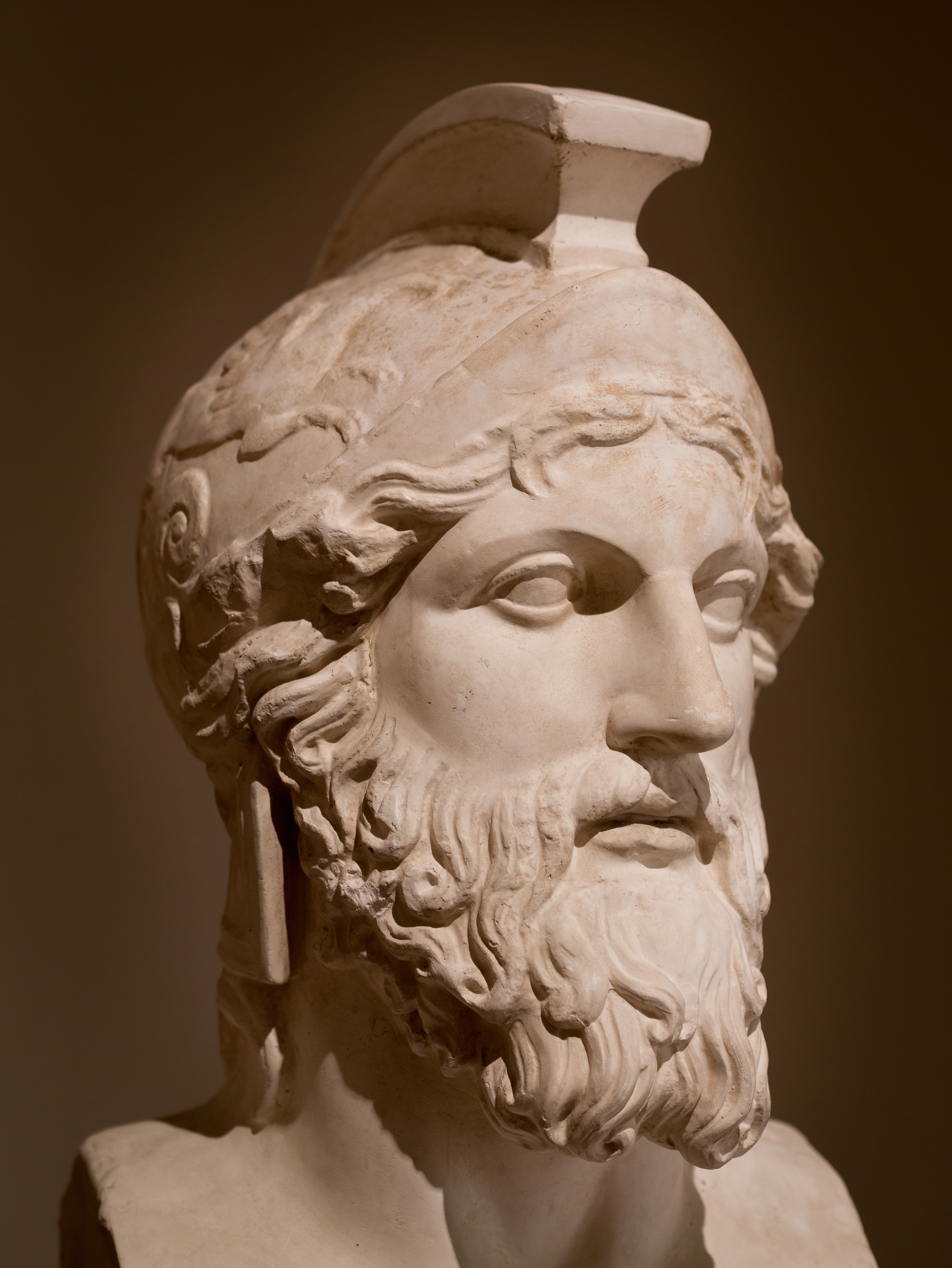
- Roman copy of Greek bust of Miltiades (original dating to 5th–4th century BC)

Eponymous archon of Athens
- In office 524 – 523 BC
- Preceded by: Cleisthenes
- Succeeded by: Calliades

Tyrant of Chersonese
- In office 516 – 492 BC
- Preceded by: Stesagoras

Personal details
- Born: 550 BC Athens
- Died: 489 BC (aged 60–61) Athens
- Spouse: Hegesipyle of Thrace
- Children: Cimon; Elpinice; Metiochus
- Awards: Statue of Nemesis by Pheidias

Military service
- Allegiance: Athens
- Rank: strategos
- Battles/wars: Scythian campaign; Ionian Revolt; First Persian invasion of Greece; Battle of Marathon; Battle of Paros

Miltiades (/mɪlˈtaɪəˌdiːz/; Ancient Greek: Μιλτιάδης Κίμωνος; c. 550 – 489 BC), also known as Miltiades the Younger, was an Athenian general and statesman known mostly for his role in the Battle of Marathon, as well as for his downfall afterwards. He was the son of Cimon Coalemos, a renowned Olympic chariot-racer, and the father of Cimon, the noted Athenian statesman.

== Family ==
Miltiades was a well-born Athenian, and was accounted a member of the Aeacidae, as well as a member of the prominent Philaid clan. He came of age during the tyranny of the Peisistratids.

His family was prominent, due in good part to their success with Olympic chariot-racing. Plutarch claimed that Cimon, Miltiades's father, was known as "Coalemos", meaning "simpleton", because he had a reputation for being rough around the edges, but whose three successive chariot-racing victories at the Olympics made him popular, so popular in fact that, Herodotus claims, the sons of Peisistratos murdered him out of jealousy.

Miltiades was named after his father's maternal half-brother, Miltiades the Elder, who was also a victor at Olympic chariot-racing.

Miltiades's son Cimon was a major Athenian figure of the 470s and 460s BC. His daughter Elpinice is remembered for her confrontations with Pericles, as recorded by Plutarch.

== Tyrant of the Thracian Chersonese ==
Map of Thracian Chersonesus

Around 555 BC, Miltiades the Elder left Athens to establish a colony on the Thracian Chersonese (now the Gallipoli Peninsula), setting himself up as a semi-autonomous tyrant under the protection of Athens. Meanwhile, despite alleged rumors that abounded that his father had been murdered by the city leaders, Miltiades the Younger rose through the ranks of Athens to become eponymous archon under the rule of the Peisistratid tyrant Hippias in 524/23 BC.

Miltiades the Elder was childless, so when he died around 520 BC, his nephew Stesagoras inherited the tyranny of the Chersonese. Four years later (516 BC), Stesagoras met his death by an axe to the head, the tyrant of Athens Hippias sent Miltiades the Younger to claim his uncle's lands. Stesagoras's reign had been tumultuous, full of revolts often led by the native Dolonci, who after the death of Miltiades the Elder were no longer inclined to serve under Greek rule. Wishing to achieve stronger control over his lands than his uncle had, Miltiades feigned mourning for his uncle’s death. When the men of rank from the Chersonese came to console him, he imprisoned them. He then ensured his power by employing 500 troops. He also made an alliance with King Olorus of Thrace by marrying his daughter, Hegesipyle.

=== Persian vassal ===
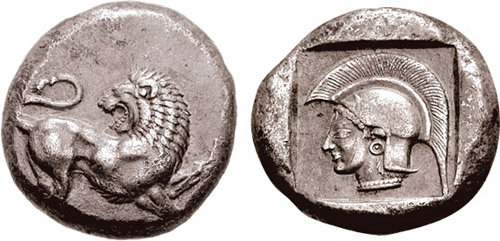
Coinage of Miltiades in Thracian Chersonesos: lion, head left, raising left forepaw, tail curled above; head of Athena, wearing crested Attic helmet and earring, within incuse square; c. 495–494 BC

In around 513 BC, Darius I, the king of Persia, led a large army into the area, forcing the Thracian Chersonese into submission and making Miltiades a vassal of Persian rule. Miltiades joined Darius's northern expedition against the Scythians, and was left with other Greek officers to guard a bridge across the Danube, which Darius had used to cross into Scythia. Miltiades later claimed that he had tried to convince the other officers to destroy the bridge and leave Darius and his forces to die, but the others were afraid, and Darius was able to recross, though some historians are skeptical of this claim. When the king heard of the planned sabotage, Miltiades's rule became a perilous affair and he had to flee around 511/510 BC. Miltiades joined the Ionian Revolt of 499 BC against Persian rule, returning to the Chersonese around 496 BC. He established friendly relations with Athens by capturing the islands of Lemnos and Imbros and ceding them to Athens, which had ancient claims to these lands.

== Return to Athens ==
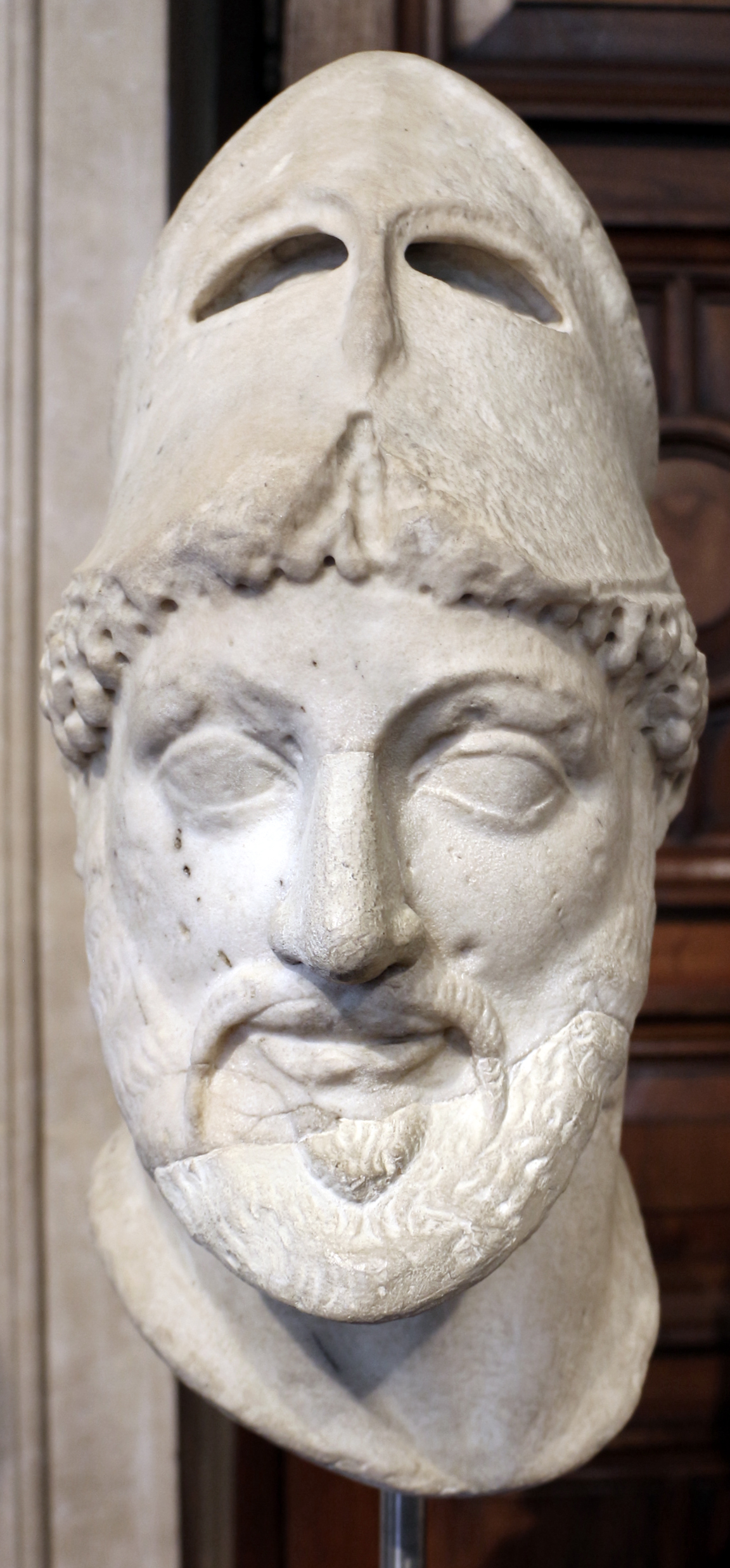
Miltiades, Roman copy of 5th century original.

The Ionian Revolt collapsed in 494 BC, and in 493 BC Miltiades and his family fled to Athens in five ships to escape a retaliatory Persian invasion. (Note: One ship, carrying his son Metiochos, was captured by the Persian fleet and Metiochos was made a lifelong prisoner, but was nonetheless treated honourably as a de facto member of the Persian nobility.)

Upon his return to Athens, Miltiades would have encountered a city much changed. Athens was no longer a Tyranny, as the Athenians had overthrown the Peisistratids 15 years previously. Since then Athens had established democracy as the new form of governance. Thus, Miltiades initially faced a hostile reception for his tyrannical rule in the Thracian Chersonese and was put on trial. His trial was further complicated by the politics of his aristocratic rivals (he came from the Philaid clan, traditional rivals of the powerful Alcmaeonidae) and the general Athenian mistrust of a man accustomed to unfettered authority. However, Miltiades successfully presented himself as a defender of Greek freedoms against Persian despotism. He also promoted the fact that he had been a first-hand witness to Persian tactics, which was useful knowledge considering the Persians were bent on destroying the city. Thus, Miltiades escaped punishment and was allowed to rejoin his old countrymen. It was by Miltiades's advice that the Persian heralds who came to Athens to demand earth and water as tokens of submission were put to death.

== Battle of Marathon ==
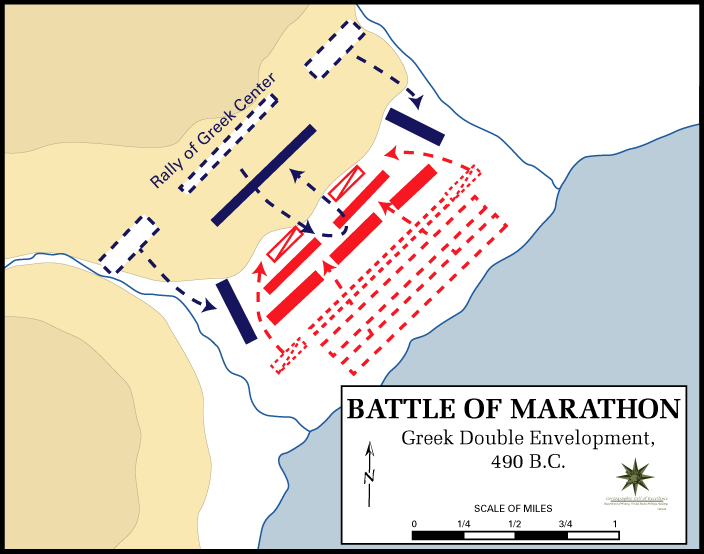
The Battle of Marathon

Miltiades is often credited with devising the tactics that led to the defeat of the Persians at the Battle of Marathon. Miltiades was elected to serve as one of the ten generals (strategoi) for 490 BC. In addition to the ten generals, there was one 'war-ruler' (polemarch), Callimachus, who had to decide—with the ten generals evenly split, five to five—whether to attack the Persians who had landed at Marathon under the command of Datis, or wait to fight them closer to Athens.

Miltiades, as the general with the most experience in fighting the Persians to that point, was firm in insisting that the Persians be fought immediately, as a siege of Athens would lead to its destruction. He convinced Callimachus to use his decisive vote in favor of a swift attack. (Note: In Herodotus's account, Miltiades is keen to attack the Persians (despite knowing that the Spartans are coming to aid the Athenians), but strangely, chooses to wait until his actual day of command to attack.) He is quoted as saying "I believe that, provided the Gods will give fair play and no favor, we are able to get the best of it in the engagement."

Miltiades also convinced the other generals of the necessity of not using the customary tactics of using hoplites arrayed in an evenly distributed phalanx armed with shields and spears, tactics otherwise not deviated from for 100 years, until the time of Epaminondas. (Note: At the Battle of Leuctra.) Miltiades feared the cavalry of the Persians attacking the flanks, and asked for more hoplites to be stationed there than in the centre. He ordered the two tribes in the centre, the Leontis tribe led by Themistocles and the Antiochis tribe led by Aristides, to be arrayed to a depth of four ranks while the rest of the tribes, on their flanks, were arrayed in eight ranks. Miltiades also had his men march to the end of the Persian archer range, called the "beaten zone", then break out in a run straight at the Persian army.

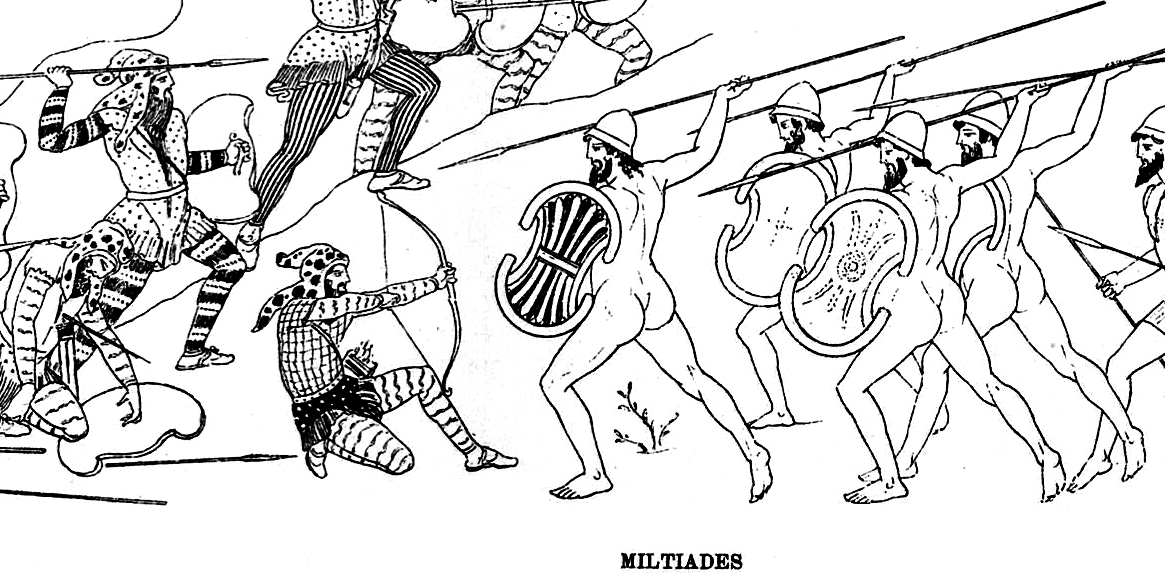
Miltiades fighting the Persians at the Battle of Marathon, in the Stoa Poikile (reconstitution)

These tactics were successful in defeating the Persians, who then tried to sail around the Cape Sounion and attack Attica from the west. Miltiades got his men to quickly march to the western side of Attica overnight and block the two exits from the plain of Marathon, to prevent the Persians from moving inland. Datis fled at the sight of the soldiers who had just defeated him the previous evening.

One theory for the Greek success in the battle is the lack of Persian cavalry. The theory is that the Persian cavalry left Marathon for an unspecified reason, and that the Greeks moved to take advantage of this by attacking. This theory is based on the absence of any mention of cavalry in Herodotus's account of the battle, and an entry in the Suda dictionary. The entry χωρὶς ἱππεῖς ("without cavalry") is explained thus:

The cavalry left. When Datis surrendered and was ready for retreat, the Ionians climbed the trees and gave the Athenians the signal that the cavalry had left. And when Miltiades realized that, he attacked and thus won. From there comes the above-mentioned quote, which is used when someone breaks ranks before battle.

=== Expedition to Paros ===
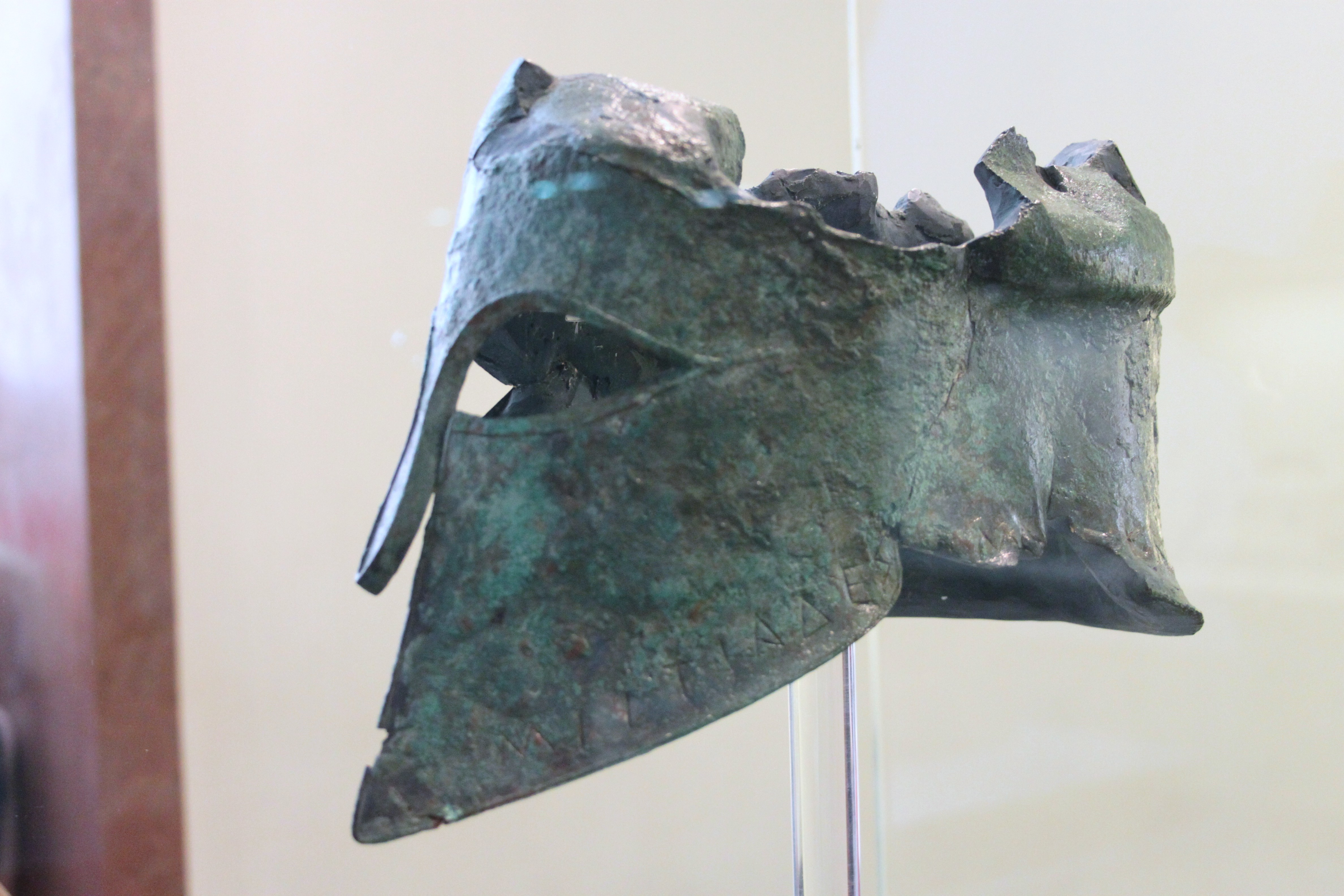
"Helmet of Miltiades". The helmet was given as an offering to the temple of Zeus at Olympia by Miltiades. Inscription on the helmet: ΜΙΛΤΙΑΔΕΣ ΑΝΕ[Θ]ΕΚΕΝ [Τ]ΟΙ ΔΙ ("Miltiades dedicates this helmet to Zeus"). Archaeological Museum of Olympia.

The following year (489 BC), Miltiades led an Athenian expedition of seventy ships against the Greek-inhabited islands that were deemed to have supported the Persians. The expedition was not a success. His true motivations were to attack Paros, feeling he had been slighted by them in the past. The fleet attacked the island, which had been conquered by the Persians, but failed to take it. Miltiades suffered a grievous leg wound during the campaign and became incapacitated. His failure prompted an outcry on his return to Athens, enabling his political rivals to exploit his fall from grace. Charged with treason, he was sentenced to death, but the sentence was converted to a fine of fifty talents. He was sent to prison where he died, probably of gangrene from his wound. The debt was paid by his son Cimon.

== Legacy ==
Pheidias later erected in Miltiades's honour, in the temple of the goddess at Rhamnus, a statue of Nemesis, the deity whose job it was to bring sudden ill fortune to those who had experienced an excess of good. The statue was said to have been made from marble provided by Datis for a memorial to the Persians' expected victory.

=== Stoa Poikile ===
Aeschines writes that although Miltiades wanted his name to be written in the Stoa Poikile, the Athenians refused. Instead of writing his name they had him painted in the front rank, urging the soldiers. This Painting was then placed in the Stoa as one of four paintings depicting great battles, such as a painting of The Sack of Troy and the trial of Ajax the Lesser, by Polygnotus.

== See also ==
- Mētiokhos kai Parthenopē

== Sources ==
- Creasy, Edward (1915) [1856]. The Fifteen Decisive Battles of the World: from Marathon to Waterloo (7th ed.). Oxford University Press. OCLC 4527642.
- Hammond, N.G.L.; Scullard, H.H., eds. (1970). Oxford Classical Dictionary (Second ed.). Oxford University Press. ISBN 0-19-869117-3.
- Herodotus (1998). Histories. Oxford World's Classics. Oxford University Press. ISBN 0-19-282425-2.
- Strassler, Robert B. The Landmark Herodotus: The Histories. Anchor Books, 2009.
- Bengtson, Hermann. The Greeks and The Persians: From the Sixth Century to the Fourth Century. Weidenfeld & Nicolson, 1969.
