= Athenion =

Athenion is a personal name used in ancient Greece. It may refer to:

- Athenion of Maroneia, 4th-century BC Thracian painter
- Athenion of Araphen, an otherwise unknown Athenian man who served as presbys in 383 BC
- Athenion, an otherwise unknown mythographer referred to in the scholia on Apollonius of Rhodes and the Iliad
- Athenion, an otherwise unknown artist of the 2nd century BCE who created a renowned sardonyx cameo known as Zeus and the Giants that is in the collection of the National Archaeological Museum, Naples
- Athenion (general), 1st-century BC commander employed by Cleopatra
- Athenion, a peripatetic philosopher and failed revolutionary often confused with Aristion
- Athenion of Cilicia, leader in the Second Servile War (104–100 BC)
- Athenion (actor), 1st century BCE
- Athenion (comic poet), comic poet
- Athenion (physician), physician who lived somewhere between 300 BCE and 100 CE

== See also ==
- Gaius Rusticelius Athenio, a member of the Rusticelia gens of ancient Rome
