= Aristonymus =

Aristonymus is the name of a number of people from ancient Greek history:

- Aristonymus of Athens, friend or associate of Plato
- Aristonymus (writer), contemporary of Aristophanes
- Aristonymus, an Athenian man mentioned by the historian Thucydides as acting to ratify a temporary truce with Athenaeus of Sparta during the Peloponnesian War
- Aristonymus, a grammarian mentioned in the Suda and evidently confused with the Aristonymus who wrote comic plays
- Aristonymus of Byzantium, described in some ancient texts as the librarian of the Library of Alexandria. Modern scholars believe this to be an error, and intending to refer to Aristophanes of Byzantium.
- Aristonymus, the name of two otherwise unknown writers mentioned by Plutarch, neither of whom appeared to be the same as any of the other men with this name described here.
