= Battle of Salamis (disambiguation) =

The Battle of Salamis was a decisive naval battle between the Greek city-states and Persia in 480 BC at Salamis island off Athens, that stopped the second Persian invasion of Greece.

The term may also refer to one of several battles fought at or near the city of Salamis, Cyprus:

- Battle of Salamis (497 BC), a simultaneous land and sea battle during the Ionian Revolt
- Battle of Salamis (450 BC), a simultaneous land and sea battle of the Greco-Persian Wars in Cyprus
- Battle of Salamis (306 BC), naval battle in Cyprus between the fleets of Ptolemy I of Egypt and Demetrius Poliorcetes
