= Pericleidas =

Ancient Spartan general

Pericleidas (Ancient Greek: Περικλείδας; fl. 5th century BCE) was a man of ancient Sparta -- possibly the proxenos of Athens at Sparta -- who played a role during the Peloponnesian War.

After the 464 BC Sparta earthquake, Pericleidas led a diplomatic mission to Athens to appeal for help putting down the revolt of the Helots against the Spartan aristocracy that the earthquake had unleashed. The Athenian general Cimon agreed to this and sent soldiers, but the Spartans rejected them when they arrived, as the Spartans worried that the Athenians' political leanings might make them too sympathetic to the Helots. This rejection was a precipitating event in the First Peloponnesian War.

A century later, this act was still a topic of discussion for Athenians, and the scene as portrayed in Aristophanes's 4th century BCE play Lysistrata derisively describes Pericleidas, his face "pale with fear", combining religion and politics by approaching Athenian altars "begging for an army".

Pericleidas had a son, Athenaeus of Sparta. The names of both Pericleidas and Athenaeus suggest some close relationship with Athens or its leading families, leading some scholars to speculate whether the family had some relationship with that of Pericles. Some scholars consider it likely that Pericleidas was friendly with the Athenian general Cimon, and it is often remarked on in the literature how the Spartan Pericleidas had a son named Athenaeus ("Athenian") and the Athenian Cimon had a son named Lacedaemonius ("Spartan").
