= Battle of Salamis in Cyprus =

Battle of Salamis in Cyprus may refer to two different battles:

- Battle of Salamis in Cyprus (450 BC)
- Battle of Salamis in Cyprus (306 BC)
