= Leonteus =

Leonteus, may refer to:

- 3793 Leonteus, a Trojan asteroid
- Leonteus (mythology), one of several Greek mythological figures
- Leonteus of Argos, ancient Greek playwright or actor
- Leonteus of Lampsacus, a 3rd-century BC pupil of Epicurus, and husband of Themista of Lampsacus
