= Thasian rebellion =

Thasos rebelled against Athenian control (465 BC)

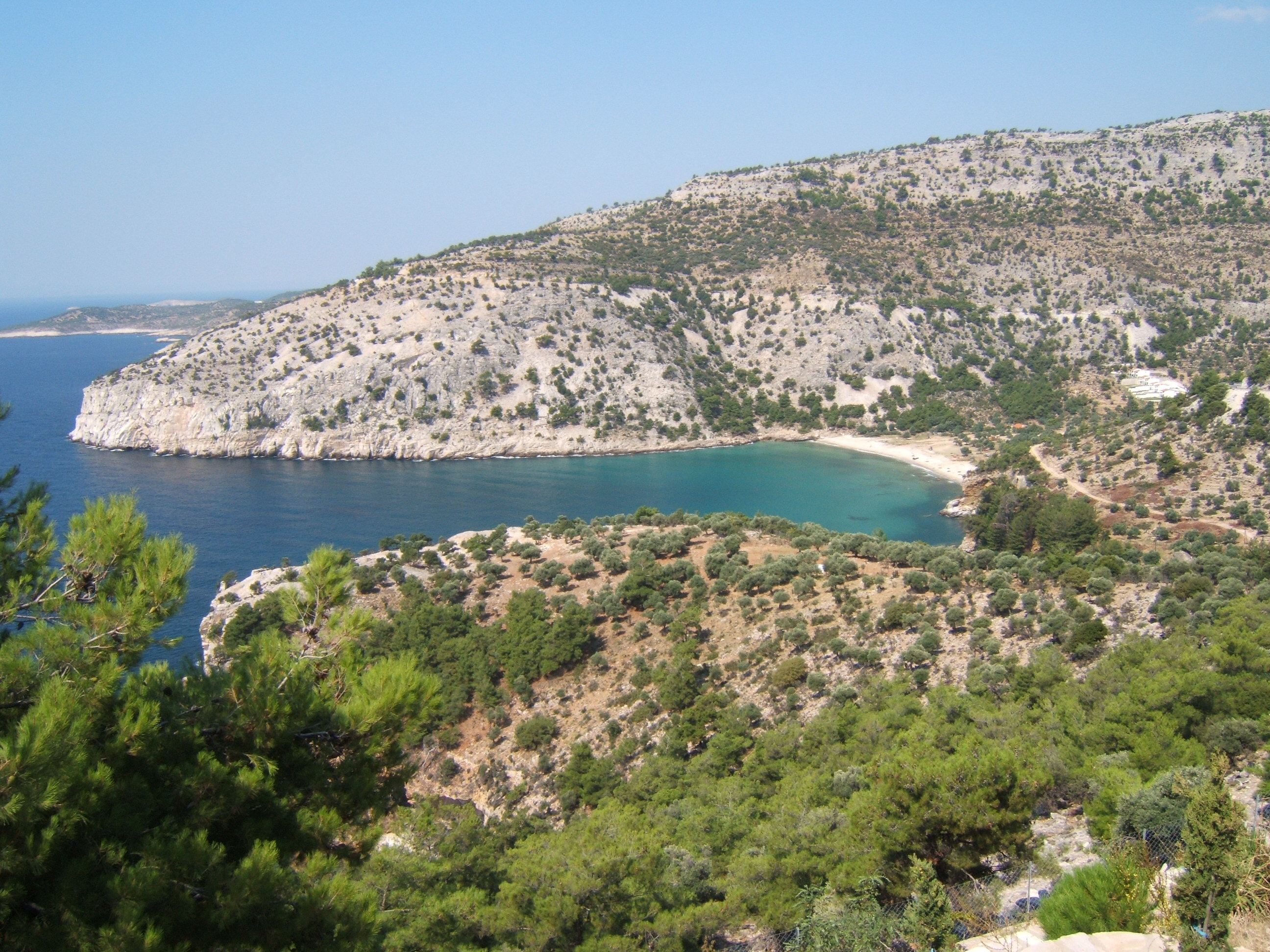
South coast of Thasos/Greece

The Thasian rebellion was an incident in 465 BC, in which Thasos rebelled against Athenian control, seeking to renounce its membership in the Delian League. The rebellion was prompted by a conflict between Athens and Thasos over control of silver deposits on the Thracian mainland, which Thasos had traditionally mined.

The rebellion was eventually crushed in 463 BC after a long and difficult siege, but not before Sparta had secretly promised to invade Attica in support of the Thasians. The Spartans were prevented from making good on this promise only by an earthquake in Laconia in 464 BC, which triggered a helot rebellion.

Thucydides cited the Thasian episode as one of the incidents during the Pentecontaetia which marked the transformation of the Delian League into an Athenian empire. Modern scholars have also approached it as a telling indicator of the internal politics of Sparta, revealing the presence of a strong war party there during a time of peace and harmony between Athens and Sparta and foreshadowing the breakdown of relations which would result in the outbreak of the First Peloponnesian War by the end of the decade.

== Athens and Thasos ==
Thucydides reports that the dispute between Athens and Thasos was caused by a dispute over control of markets on the Thracian coast and a gold mine that the Thasians controlled. Most scholars believe that Athens was the aggressor in this dispute, although G.E.M. de Ste. Croix has argued that the Athenians were intervening on behalf of a smaller state suffering under Thasian domination. The mine and markets were profitable holdings, and losing them to the Athenians would have been a serious economic blow for Thasos; as this dispute was arising, Athens also dispatched a large group of settlers to found a colony called Ennea Hodoi ("the nine ways") at what would eventually become the site of Amphipolis. This colony, had it succeeded (it was overwhelmed by natives after a brief period), would have served as a base to project Athenian power and influence in a region where Thasos had long had interests. Thasos was a powerful naval state and a charter member of the Delian League, and rather than bow to these Athenian incursions the Thasians chose to resist militarily.

== War ==
An initial battle resulted in an Athenian victory, and the city of Thasos was besieged. This siege would continue for over two years, during which the population of Thasos would endure severe hardships; an anecdote regarding a siege at Thasos during which anyone who proposed surrender to the Athenians was subject to the death penalty, and another regarding Thasian women cutting their hair to provide rope-making material during a desperate shortage both probably refer to this siege. This determined Thasian resistance may have been in part a result of news of the Athenian setback at Ennea Hodoi, where the colonists, after early success, were defeated and driven off by local tribesmen (it is unclear whether only the military escort of 300 men or all 10,000 settlers were killed). The Thasians were also hoping for delivery by outside intervention; they had appealed to Sparta for assistance, and had received a secret promise of support in the form of an invasion of Attica; this promise, however, was never carried out, as an earthquake in Laconia threw Sparta into disorder and triggered a helot revolt, which would occupy the Spartan army for a number of years. In 463 BC, therefore, the Thasians were at last forced to surrender.

== Significance and aftermath ==
The Athenians imposed a harsh settlement on their defeated rivals. Thasos abandoned its claims to the disputed territories on the mainland, tore down its walls, gave up its fleet, and agreed to pay indemnities and tribute to Athens. At first that tribute was assessed at only 3 talents per year, but in the 440s BC it was increased to 30 talents; some scholars have viewed this increase as a sign that Thasos' mine and other holdings had been returned, others believe that it reflects a return to prosperity after the devastation of the war, and still others believe that the 3 talents was an abnormally low assessment, reflecting the burden of the indemnity the Thasians were paying, and that the increase merely represented an assessment based on the wealth of the island of Thasos itself.

The Spartan promise of intervention has been the subject of much analysis by scholars attempting to discern the inner workings of the Spartan state during this period, and modern scholars have cited the Thasos promise as evidence of a war party active at Sparta even during the period of accord between Athens and Sparta in the 470s and 460s BC; Although this war party was thwarted by the earthquake in this case, only a few years later anti-Athenian sentiment at Sparta would trigger the dismissal of Cimon with his army, which had been dispatched by the Athenians to assist in suppressing the helot rebellion, and the First Peloponnesian War would be afoot.
