= Charitimides =

5th-century BCE Athenian Admiral

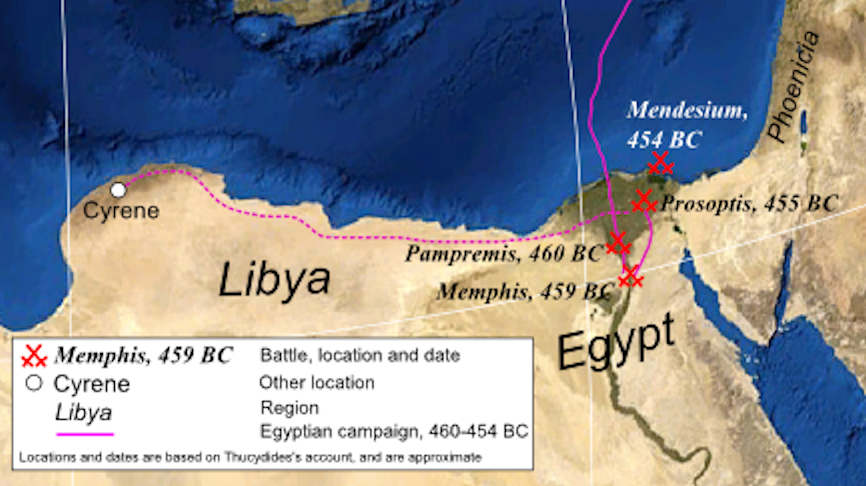
Main actions of the Egyptian campaign of the Wars of the Delian League, to which Charitimides participated.

Charitimides (Ancient Greek: Χαριτιμίδης) (died 455 BCE) was an Athenian admiral of the 5th century BCE that was sent to support Inaros II, an Egyptian ruler rebelling against the Achaemenid rule in Egypt.

== Egyptian Expedition of Athens ==
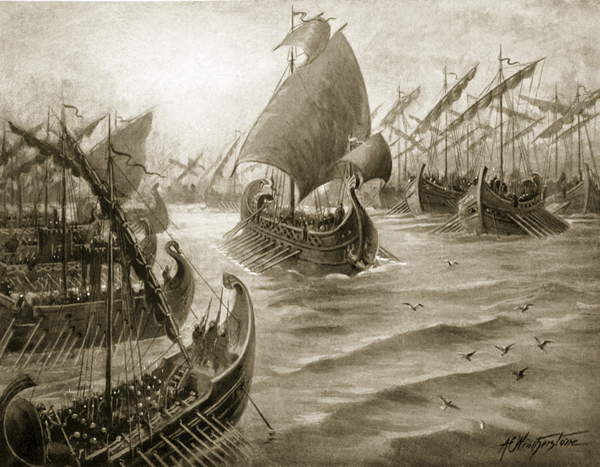
The fleet of Charitimides was initially part of the Cyprus expedition led by Cimon.

=== Commander of the Athenian expedition to Egypt ===
At the time of the Wars of the Delian League, a continuing conflict between the Athenian-led Delian League of Greek city-states and the Achaemenid Empire, he was sent in 460 BCE to Egypt in command of a fleet of triremes (some authors say 40 ships, others 200 ships) to support Inaros II, an Egyptian ruler initially based in Libya who was leading a revolt against the Achaemenid rule over the country. Charitimides' fleet had been operating on the coasts of Cyprus, from where he was diverted to Egypt.

=== Athenian Naval victory ===
He led his fleet against the Achaemenids in the Nile River, and defeated a fleet of 50 Phoenician ships. It was the last great naval encounter between the Greeks and the Achaemenids. Of the 50 Phoenician ships, he managed to destroy thirty while capturing the remainder.

=== Athenian Defeat and Death ===
When the Achaemenids returned with a large army under Megabyzus, they lifted the siege of Memphis where the remaining Persian garrison had been blockaded, and then besieged the Egyptians and their Greek allies in the Siege of Prosopitis in 455 BCE. Charitimides perished in the battle .

== Aftermath ==
Other Greek generals who later also fought on the side of the Egyptians against the Persians, include the Athenian Chabrias and the Spartan Agesilaus.

== See also ==
- Wars of the Delian League
- Athenian military
