= Athenion (general) =

1st-century BCE military commander in service to Cleopatra VII

Athenion was a military commander of the Egyptian queen Cleopatra in Coele-Syria in the late 30s BC.

== Life ==
Athenion is only known through the report given by the Jewish historian Josephus on Herod the Great. But the account of Josephus is very hostile to Cleopatra and reflects in this connection the negative reporting of the memoirs of the Jewish king on the Ptolemaic queen, which found their way via Nicolaus of Damascus into the historic works of Josephus. Therefore, Josephus’ unreliable reporting on Cleopatra has to be evaluated carefully.

When in 32 BC the preparations for the final war between Mark Antony and Octavian were beginning Herod wanted to come to Antony's rescue with an army, but was sent back by Antony to fight against Malichus, king of the Nabataeans, instead. According to Josephus Cleopatra is said to have been responsible for this decision of the triumvir, but the German classical scholar Christoph Schäfer does not believe that this is true. After Herod had won the first military encounter against the Nabataeans and threatened to also rout them in a second battle near Canatha, Athenion is supposed to have intervened in favour of the Nabataeans and helped them decisively to defeat the Jewish troops. Christoph Schäfer considers Athenion's allegedly attack on Herod is an invention of Josephus or his sources. He argues that if Athenion really helped the Nabataeans in the battle near Canatha it is not understandable why Cleopatra's general did not interfere in Herodes’ later very successful battles against the Nabataeans, which took place in summer 31 BC. Michael Grant is not so skeptically disposed to the report of Josephus.

Nothing is recorded about the further fate of Athenion.
