= Athenaeus of Sparta =

Ancient Spartan general

Athenaeus (Ancient Greek: Ἀθήναιος), son of Pericleidas, was a man of ancient Sparta who served during the Peloponnesian War. He was one of the commissioners who, on the part of the Spartans and their allies, ratified the truce for one year which in 423 BCE was made between the Spartans and Athenians and their allies after the Spartans and Athenians agreed to exchange the hostages for the towns captured by the general Brasidas.

Afterwards he and the Athenian Aristonymus went around to announce the ratification of the truce to Brasidas and other officers of the belligerent parties.

The names Athenaeus and Pericleidas mark the friendly relations which existed between this family and the Athenians, and more especially the family of Pericles.
