= 464 BC Sparta earthquake =

Earthquake affecting ancient Greece

- Location within Greece
- Local date: 464 BC
- Magnitude: 7.2 M_{s}
- Epicenter: 37.08°N 22.43°E
- Areas affected: Sparta, Greece
- Casualties: up to 20,000

The 464 BC Spartan earthquake occurred along the Sparta fault in the year 464 BC destroying much of what was Sparta and many other city-states in ancient Greece. Historical sources suggest that the death toll may have been as high as 20,000, although modern scholars suggest that this figure is likely an exaggeration. The earthquake gave Spartan helots an opportunity to revolt against their aristocratic rulers, and the Spartan Pericleidas was sent to the Athenians to seek their aid. Their immediate dismissal upon arrival is said to have been a key event that led up to the First Peloponnesian War.

== Tectonic setting ==
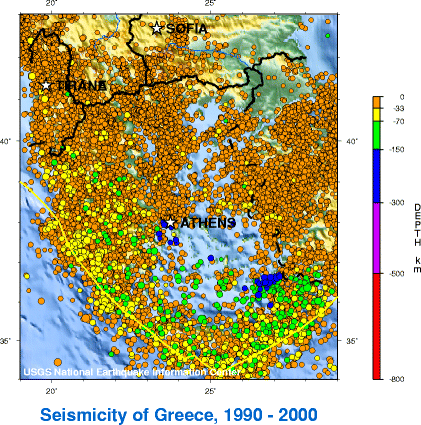
Seismicity around Greece between 1990 and 2000

Sparta was located on what is currently called the Hellenic arc which is predisposed to large seismic activity due to the convergence and subduction of the African plate beneath the Aegean Sea plate. The convergent and subduction of these plates are also seen in the geographical landscape in present-day Greece with large mountain ranges as well as many islands and the lands drop off into the Mediterranean Sea.

Present day Greece still experiences seismic activity regularly; however, it is usually much milder than the one felt in 464 BC.

== Effects ==
Accounts of the earthquake and its consequences are based on only a few often unreliable historical sources, specifically the writings of Strabo, Pausanias, Plutarch, and Thucydides. As there is little recorded about the earthquake itself in contemporary records, it is difficult to judge the exact epicenter and magnitude of the event. However, the earthquake is believed to have been 'medium to large' according to many historians and occurred due to movement on a fault near the Taygetus Mountains. A 1991 study attempted to locate the fault responsible for the event and estimate the magnitude of the earthquake based on satellite imagery and fieldwork. The authors of the study conclude that if the 464 BC event took place along the fault whose scarp they identified, its magnitude would have been approximately 7.2 on the surface-wave magnitude scale.

Due to the lack of proper infrastructure and seismic engineering knowledge during this time casualties were originally thought to be very high with some contemporary sources believing the death toll to be around 20,000. However, modern scholars believe this might be an exaggeration due to the fact that at the time the city was relatively small and spread out, with most buildings being one floor and constructed from wood or sun-baked brick making it hard to believe that casualties could have been so high. The lack of detailed population records, coupled with flight of survivors to other areas, may have contributed to the uncertainty, as it can today. In such a catastrophic earthquake, it is also unlikely that a number of the anecdotal tales from the time could be true, such as the Spartan king Archidamus leading the Spartan army out of the city to safety. Regardless of the exact death toll, there was some destruction, and the helots, the serf class in Spartan society, took advantage of this moment to rise in rebellion.

== Historical significance ==
The 464 BC Sparta earthquake is marked by scholars as one of the key events that led to the First Peloponnesian War. However, according to Thucydides, the ancient Greek chronicler of the Peloponnesian War, Sparta had already decided to invade Attica when the earthquake struck. In the aftermath of the earthquake, the helots and various Messenian subjects of Sparta revolted; Sparta invoked the aid of other Greek cities to put down the rebellion, which they were obliged to help in accordance with the alliance. Athens, whose aid the Spartans sought because of their "reputed experience in siege operations," sent approximately 4,000 hoplites under the leadership of Cimon, but this contingent was sent back to Athens, while those from other cities were allowed to stay. By Thucydides' account (History of the Peloponnesian War, I.101–102), the Spartans were concerned that the Athenians would switch sides and assist the helots; from the Spartan perspective, the Athenians had an "enterprising and revolutionary character," and by this fact alone posed a threat to the oligarchic regime of Sparta. The Athenians were insulted, and therefore repudiated their alliance with Sparta. Once the uprising was put down, some of the surviving rebels fled to Athens, which settled them at Naupactus on the strategically important Corinthian Gulf. The alliance between Sparta and Athens was never revived, and disagreements continued to intensify until the outbreak of war in 460 BC. Since the Helot population used the earthquake as their opportunity to rebel, the Spartans were forced to wait to reform their society until after they had suppressed the Helots.

== See also ==
- List of earthquakes in Greece
- List of historical earthquakes
