= Athenion (actor) =

Ancient Greek actor and tragic poet

Athenion (Ancient Greek: Ἀθηνίων) or Athenio was involved in the theatre of 1st-century BC Greco-Roman world.

He is often described as a tragic poet. He lived around the middle of the 1st century BCE, and was the instructor of Leonteus of Argos, who is also often described as a tragic poet.

Some scholars dispute this reading of the ancient texts and contend that both Athenion and his pupil were tragic actors only, and did not write plays.
