= Aristonymus (writer) =

Ancient Greek writer living around the 4th century

Aristonymus (Ancient Greek: Ἀριστώνυμος) was a comic playwright and contemporary of Aristophanes and Ameipsias. We know the titles of only two of his comedies, Theseus, and Helios Shivering (Ἥλιος ῾ριγῶν), of which only a few fragments are extant.

Scholars Johann Schweighäuser and Johann Albert Fabricius placed this writer in the reign of Ptolemy Philadelphus, which later scholars came to regard as an error derived from possibly incorrect information in Aristonymus's entry in the Suda, in which this Aristonymus appears to be confused with a different Aristonymus who was a grammarian. The Suda also indicates that this Aristonymus was the Librarian of Alexandria, though we know that was also a mistake, and intended to refer not to an Aristonymus but to Aristophanes of Byzantium instead.
