= Rusticelia gens =

Plebeian family of ancient Rome

The gens Rusticelia, occasionally spelled Rusticellia, was an obscure plebeian family of ancient Rome. Hardly any members of this gens are mentioned by ancient writers, but a number are known from inscriptions.

== Origin ==
The nomen Rusticelius belongs to a class of gentilicia formed from cognomina ending in the diminutive suffixes -illus and -ellus. It appears to be derived from rusticellus, clownish, probably a diminutive of rusticus, rural or unsophisticated, rustic.

== Praenomina ==
The chief praenomina of the Rusticelii were Gaius, Lucius, Aulus, and Quintus, all of which were very common throughout Roman history. Other praenomina are found infrequently, including Marcus and Publius, otherwise common names.

== Branches and cognomina ==
The Rusticelii bore a variety of surnames in imperial times, most of which seem to have been personal cognomina. A number of Rusticelii lived at Ostia, Rome's ancient seaport, where several of them bore the surname Felix, fortunate or happy.

== Members ==
This list includes abbreviated praenomina. For an explanation of this practice, see filiation.

- Rusticelia, built a tomb at Rome for her son.
- Rusticelia, buried at Gurulis Nova in Sardinia, with a tomb dedicated by Pamphilus.
- Rusticelius, a donor to the cult of Vulcan at Ostia in Latium, in the late second century AD.
- Gaius Rusticelius, (Note: Rusticellus in some manuscripts.) a native of Bononia, was praised by Cicero as an experienced and voluble orator from among the allies.
- Lucius Rusticelius C. f., buried in a family sepulchre at Rome.
- Marcus Rusticelius C. f., buried in a family sepulchre at Rome.
- Quintus Rusticelius, named in an inscription from the present site of Riola Sardo in Sardinia.
- Quintus Rusticelius, a soldier serving in the century of Quintus Vitulus, buried at Cirta in Numidia.
- Quintus Rusticelius C. f., buried in a family sepulchre at Rome.
- Quintus Rusticelius Amerymnus, named in a series of inscriptions from Etruria and Umbria.
- Lucius Rusticelius Anoptes, a freedman buried at Rome in the late first or early second century, together with Rusticelia Tertia.
- Aulus Rusticelius Aptus, buried in a family sepulchre at Rome.
- Lucius Rusticelius Asellarius, buried at Castellum Celtianum in Numidia, aged forty-one.
- Gaius Rusticelius Athenio, dedicated a tomb at Rome for his client, Rusticelia Lemnias.
- Rusticelius Atticus, a member of one of the artisanal guilds at Rome early in the fourth century.
- Gaius Rusticelius Avitianus, buried at Madaurus in Africa Proconsularis, aged forty.
- Lucius Rusticelius Celer, one of the duumviri jure dicundo at Pompeii in Campania.
- Aulus Rusticelius A. l. Cinna, a freedman buried in a family sepulchre at Rome.
- Rusticelius Clementianus, flamen at Madaurus.
- Lucius Rusticelius Communis, buried at Rome in a tomb built by his mother, Mammia Liccaea.
- Lucius Rusticelius Cosmus, aedile in an uncertain year between 40 and 20 BC, made an offering to Neptune at Tarentum in Calabria.
- Rusticelius C. f. Crispus, son of Gaius Rusticelius Crispus and Clodia Herais, buried in the family sepulchre built by his father at Ostia, dating to the late second or early third century.
- Gaius Rusticelius Crispus, a freedman, built a tomb at Ostia for himself, his wife, Clodia Herais, his son, Rusticelius Crispus, and Gaius Rusticelius Felix, dating to the late second or early third century.
- Rusticelia M. l. Cytheris, a freedwoman named in a funerary inscription from Rome, dating to AD 10.
- Lucius Rusticelius Dolabella, a rhetorician buried at Rome, aged twenty-six years and six months, leaving a daughter, Rusticelia Selene, and a son, Zosimus Rusticelianus, a slave belonging to the imperial household. Publius Aelius Strato, a freedman of the emperor, paid for his tomb.
- Aulus Rusticelius Dorus, buried in a family sepulchre at Rome.
- Rusticelia Eromene, buried in a family sepulchre at Rome.
- Aulus Rusticelius Eros, a freedman buried at Casilinum in Campania, together with Rusticelia Euhemera.
- Quintus Rusticelius Q. l. Eros, a freedman buried at Rome with his son, Quintus Rusticelius Paratus.
- Rusticelia A. l. Euhemera, a freedwoman buried at Casilinum, together with Aulus Rusticelius Eros.
- Gaius Rusticelius Euhemerus, dedicated a tomb at Rome for his friend, Clymenus.
- Gaius Rusticelius Faustus, built a tomb at Rome for himself and his son, Gaius Rusticelius Minervius.
- Rusticelius Felix, buried at Carales in Sardinia, aged fifty.
- Rusticelius Felix, named in an inscription from Ostia in Latium, dating to AD 198.
- Gaius Rusticelius Felix, named in an inscription from Ostia.
- Gaius Rusticelius Felix, buried at Ostia, in a tomb built by Gaius Rusticelius Crispus.
- Gaius Rusticelius Felix, (Note: Tudicellius in Gruter.) a native of Africa, was a maker of figurines. He was buried at Rome, aged fifty, with a tomb dedicated by Oppia.
- Rusticelius Fortunatus, named in an inscription from Pompeii.
- Rusticelia Gemella, buried at Rome, aged nineteen.
- Aulus Rusticelius Hilarus, buried in a family sepulchre at Rome.
- Quintus Rusticelius C. f. Honoratus, buried at Madaurus, aged thirty-six years, four months.
- Lucius Rusticelius Hospes, buried at Castellum Celtianum, aged sixty.
- Gaius Rusticelius Ingenuus, made an offering to Saturn at Carthage in Africa Proconsularis.
- Rusticelia Lemnias, buried at Rome, aged twenty-five, with a tomb dedicated by her patron, Gaius Rusticelius Athenio.
- Aulus Rusticelius Martialis, buried in a family sepulchre at Rome.
- Gaius Rusticelius C. f. Minervius, buried at Rome, in a tomb built by his father, Gaius Rusticelius Faustus.
- Rusticelia Namphadora, a girl buried at Madaurus, age ten.
- Rusticelia Octavianilla, buried at Ammaedara in Africa Proconsularis, aged twenty-eight years, eight days, with a tomb built by her husband, Julius Pallans.
- Aulus Rusticelius Paratus, buried in a family sepulchre at Rome.
- Aulus Rusticelius Paratus, buried at Rome, aged thirty, with a monument from his parents.
- Quintus Rusticelius Q. l. Paratus, a freedman, buried at Rome with his father, Quintus Rusticelius Eros.
- Lucius Rusticelius Philomusus, buried at Tibur in Latium, with a tomb dedicated by his wife, Rusticelia Triumphalis.
- Rusticelia Plaste, buried in a family sepulchre at Rome.
- Gaius Rusticelius Primitivus, a member of the shipwrights' guild at Ostia in AD 152.
- Gaius Rusticelius Proculus, a priest at Ammaedara, who together with his wife, Faonia Doniatula, made a libationary offering to the imperial family at the beginning of the third century AD.
- Rusticelia Ɔ. l. Rufa, a freedwoman, perhaps the wife of Lucius Plautius Scurra, and mother of Lucius Plautius and Plautia Tertia, whose names appear on the monument of their father at Signia in Latium, dating to the middle of the first century BC.
- Publius Rusticelius Saltator, dedicated a monument to Hercules at Tibur.
- Lucius Rusticelius Secundus, one of the Seviri Augustales and a decurion at Comum.
- Rusticelia L. f. Selene, the daughter of Lucius Rusticelius Dolabella, an orator buried at Rome.
- Rusticelia Sterceia, buried at Madaurus, aged fourteen, together with her mother, Claudia Valeria, aged forty.
- Rusticelia Tertia, a freedwoman buried at Rome in the late first or early second century, together with Lucius Rusticelius Anoptes.
- Marcus Rusticelius Tertius, gave pots made by Gaius Vettius Philomusus to Maetennia Europa and Lucius Vibius Gordia at Rome.
- Rusticelia Tertulla, buried at Madaurus, aged twenty-one.
- Rusticelia Triumphalis, dedicated a tomb at Tibur for her husband, Lucius Rusticelius Philomusus.
- Rusticelia Ɔ. l. Tryphera, a freedwoman buried at Rome.

== See also ==
- List of Roman gentes

== Bibliography ==
- Marcus Tullius Cicero, Brutus.
- Jan Gruter, Inscriptiones Antiquae Totius Orbis Romani (Ancient Inscriptions from the Whole Roman World), Heidelberg (1603).
- Raffaele Fabretti, Inscriptionum Antiquarum, Domenico Antonio Ercole, Rome (1699).
- Johann Caspar von Orelli, Inscriptionum Latinarum Selectarum Amplissima Collectio (An Extensive Collection of Select Latin Inscriptions), Orell Füssli, Zürich (1828).
- Dictionary of Greek and Roman Biography and Mythology, William Smith, ed., Little, Brown and Company, Boston (1849).
- Theodor Mommsen et alii, Corpus Inscriptionum Latinarum (The Body of Latin Inscriptions, abbreviated CIL), Berlin-Brandenburgische Akademie der Wissenschaften (1853–present).
- Gustav Wilmanns, Inscriptiones Africae Latinae (Latin Inscriptions from Africa, abbreviated ILAfr), Georg Reimer, Berlin (1881).
- René Cagnat et alii, L'Année épigraphique (The Year in Epigraphy, abbreviated AE), Presses Universitaires de France (1888–present).
- George Davis Chase, "The Origin of Roman Praenomina", in Harvard Studies in Classical Philology, vol. VIII, pp. 103–184 (1897).
- Stéphane Gsell, Inscriptions Latines de L'Algérie (Latin Inscriptions from Algeria, abbreviated ILAlg), Edouard Champion, Paris (1922–present).
- Zeitschrift für Papyrologie und Epigraphik (Journal of Papyrology and Epigraphy, abbreviated ZPE), (1987).
- John C. Traupman, The New College Latin & English Dictionary, Bantam Books, New York (1995).
