= Leonteus of Argos =

Ancient Greek actor and tragic poet

Leonteus (Ancient Greek: Λεοντεύς) of Argos was an actor or tragic poet of the 1st century BCE. He was the slave of king Juba I of Numidia, and a pupil of the actor or poet Athenion. It does not appear that he necessarily originated from Argos, but after he was manumitted by the king, he moved to Argos to practice the acting trade he had honed as Juba's slave.

The Greek grammarian Athenaeus preserves an epigram from the king in which he ridicules Leonteus for a terrible performance in a play based on the myth of Hypsipyle.

While some scholars describe both Athenion and Leonteus as "tragic poets", some scholars dispute this reading of the ancient texts and contend that both Athenion and his pupil were tragic actors only, and did not write plays.
