= Presbys =

Ancient Greek honorific title

Presbys (Ancient Greek: πρέσβυς) was an honorific in ancient Greece that literally meant "old man" or "elder", but, when used as a title, denoted a wide range of roles and responsibilities, but typically, in most contexts, a sort of ambassador from one polis to another. In this sense it is commonly translated as "envoy". It is the root word of the later Christian clerical title Presbyter.

We can trace the rise of this practice and title back to about the 6th century BCE. Diplomacy in the ancient world had no concept of maintaining permanent embassies on foreign soil -- the role of the proxenos was as close as the Greeks came to this -- so foreign affairs were conducted by ad hoc envoys often deputized on a temporary basis and given very limited scope of powers, typically to negotiate the resolution of a very specific problem. A presbys was chosen for their respectability and experience in politics and foreign affairs, but they were not given great latitude of powers. Typically the body that granted them their mission laid down extremely specific and restrictive instructions about how negotiations should be handled.

Certain sources divide these into "greater" (μεγάλοι) or "lesser" (ἣσσονες) envoys, though the distinction is unclear.

The role of a presbys was also highly public. The goals and negotiating strategy and power were publicly debated and described before the presbys left their home country, and the arguments the presbys presented to their destination country were also, apparently, matters of public record, in the sense that when and if terms were agreed to, they were typically engraved on a tablet which would be publicly displayed afterward.

Typically a country did not just send one presbys on a given mission, but several, sometimes as many as ten, typically each representing some faction in their home country. This is remarked in many ancient sources as being a somewhat ineffective strategy, and could sometimes communicate a lack of unity on a given topic or message, as each presbys in a group would often emphasize the perspective or special interests of their own particular faction.

Presbys was not a governmental position or office per se, and a presbys did not for example enjoy the diplomatic immunity of a true ambassador in the modern sense. But they were clearly distinct from the role of keryx, which was a messenger tasked only to deliver information, and clearly had some power to negotiate and agree to terms on behalf of their home countries.
