= Atossa (disambiguation) =

Atossa (550 BC–475 BC) was an Achaemenid empress and daughter of Cyrus the Great and Cassandane.

Atossa or Atoosa may also refer to:

- Atossa: daughter and wife of Artaxerxes II

== Objects ==
- 810 Atossa, an asteroid belonging to the Flora family in the Main Belt

== Medicines ==
- Ondansetron, a medicine used against nausea and vomiting

== People ==
- Atossa Leoni (born 1978) German-born film, television, and theater actress
- Atossa Araxia Abrahamian, Swiss-American journalist
- Atoosa Reaser, American politician

== Taxonomy ==
- Atossa, a synonym of the genus Vicia, of the legume family (Fabaceae)
- Atossa, a synonym of the genus Nossa, of the oriental swallowtail moth family (Epicopeiidae)
- Atossa, a synonym of the genus Grammoechus, longhorn beetles of the subfamily Lamiinae
- Atossa, a synonym of the genus Declana, of the geometer moth family (Geometridae)
