= Artabanus =

Artabanus (Ancient Greek: Ἁρτάβανος Artabanos; Middle Persian: ʾltwʾn Ardawān) may refer to various rulers/monarchs of ancient Persia and Parthia:

- Artabanus (son of Hystaspes), brother of Darius I and uncle of Xerxes I
- Artabanus of Persia, Hyrcanian by birth, commander of Xerxes's guard, and Xerxes's assassin (465 BC)
- Artapanus (general), general under Xerxes I (486–465 BC)
- Artabanus I of Parthia, c. 127–124 BC
- Artabanus II of Parthia, c. 12 to 38/41 AD
- Artabanus III of Parthia, 79/80 – 81
- Artabanus IV of Parthia, c. 213 to 224
- Artabanus of Khwarazm, c.1st-2nd century AD

Confusingly, two systems exist for the regnal numbers of the Artabanuses; in older works, they may be numbered as a regnal number higher than listed above; i.e. Artabanus IV might refer to Artabanus III.

The Mandaic variant of the name is Ardban (also Ardwan).

== See also ==
- Artapanus (disambiguation)
- Artapanus of Alexandria, whose name is sometimes rendered as "Artabanus"
- Artabanes (general)
