= Darius (son of Xerxes I) =

Crown Prince of Achaemenid Persia (died 465 BC)

Darius 𐎭𐎠𐎼𐎹𐎺𐎢𐏁

Crown Prince of Persia
- Born: 485 BC
- Died: 465 BC; Persia
- Spouse: Artaynte
- Dynasty: Achaemenid
- Father: Xerxes I of Persia
- Mother: Amestris

Darius (Old Persian: 𐎭𐎠𐎼𐎹𐎺𐎢𐏁 Dārayavaʰuš; Ancient Greek: Δαρεῖος Dareios; c. 485 – 465 BCE), was crown prince of the Persian Empire. He was the eldest son of the Persian king Xerxes I and his wife Amestris. His younger brothers were Hystaspes and Artaxerxes, and his younger sisters were Rhodogune and Amytis.

In 478 BC, before the revolt at Bactria, Darius was married to his cousin Artaynte at Sardis. She was also the daughter of his uncle Masistes. At the behest of Xerxes, Artaynte committed adultery with him. When the queen Amestris found out about the horrific event, she did not seek revenge against Artaynte, but against her mother, Masistes' wife, as Amestris thought that it was due to her connivance. On Xerxes' birthday, Amestris sent for his guards and mutilated Artaynte's mother. On seeing this, Masistes fled to Bactria to start a revolt, but was intercepted by Xerxes' army who killed him and his sons.

In 465 BC, Darius may have ascended to the throne as King of Persia after his father was murdered in a conspiracy carried out by Artabanus and Aspamitres the eunuch, who were confidential advisers of Xerxes. Afterwards, they deceived Artaxerxes into believing that it was his older brother, Darius, who murdered his father. Darius was then taken to the palace of Artaxerxes and put to death.

Artabanus may have had personal ambitions for the throne since, subsequently, he conspired with Megabyzus to have Artaxerxes killed. But Megabyzus revealed the plot to Artaxerxes, who put Artabanus and Aspamitres to death for the murders of Xerxes, Darius and his own attempted murder. Artabanus was killed by sword, whilst Aspamitres was left in a tub where he was eaten by insects.

== Classical sources ==
- Ctesias, Persica, books XIV - XVII
- Diodorus of Sicily, Bibliotheca historica, XI, 69
- Herodotus, Histories, book IX

== Bibliography ==
- Jacoby, Felix. (1923-1959) Die Fragmente er griechischen Historiker, Berlin
- Jacoby, Felix. (1922) "Ktesias", RE XI, 2032-2073
- Henry, René. (1959) Photius: La Bibliothèque, Paris
- Lenfant, Dominique. (2004) Ctésias. La Perse. L’Inde. Autres fragments. Paris
- Godley, Alfred Denis (1921–24). "Histories book 9". Herodotus, with an English translation. OCLC 1610641.
