= Masistes =

Persian prince (died c. 478 BC)

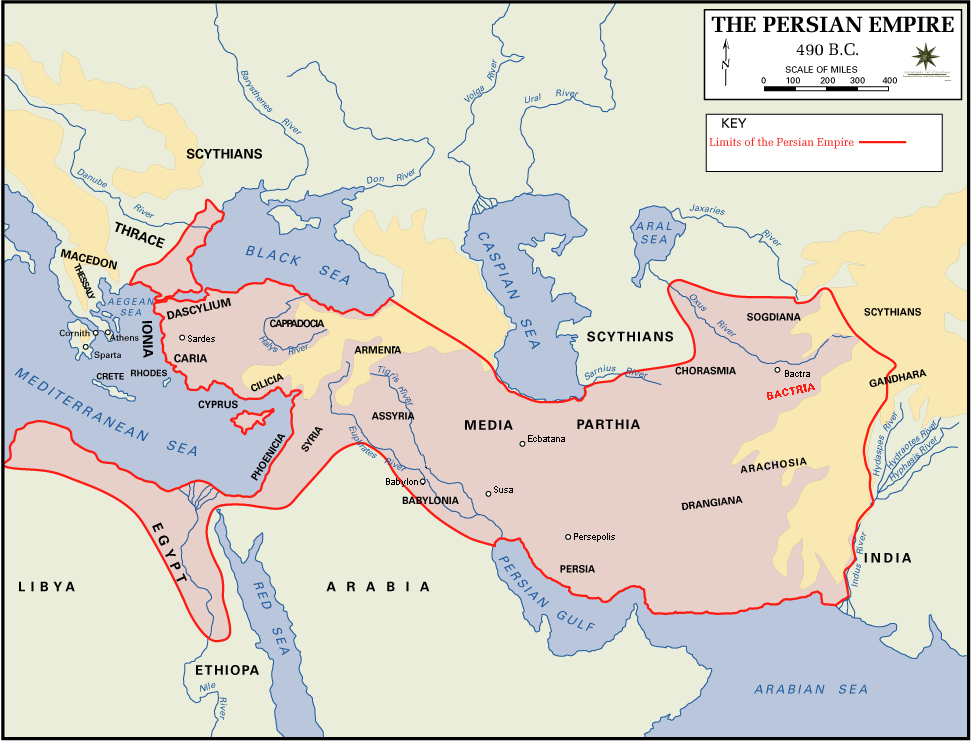
Location of Bactria within the Persian Empire.

Masistes (Old Persian 𐎶𐎰𐎡𐏁𐎫, Maθišta; Greek Μασίστης, Masístēs; Old Iranian *Masišta; died c. 478 BC) was a Persian prince of the Achaemenid Dynasty, son of king Darius I (reign: 520-486 BC) and of his wife Atossa, and full brother of king Xerxes I (reign: 486-465 BC). He was satrap (governor) of Bactria during his brother's reign, where he attempted to start a revolt in 478 BC.

== Chief marshal ==
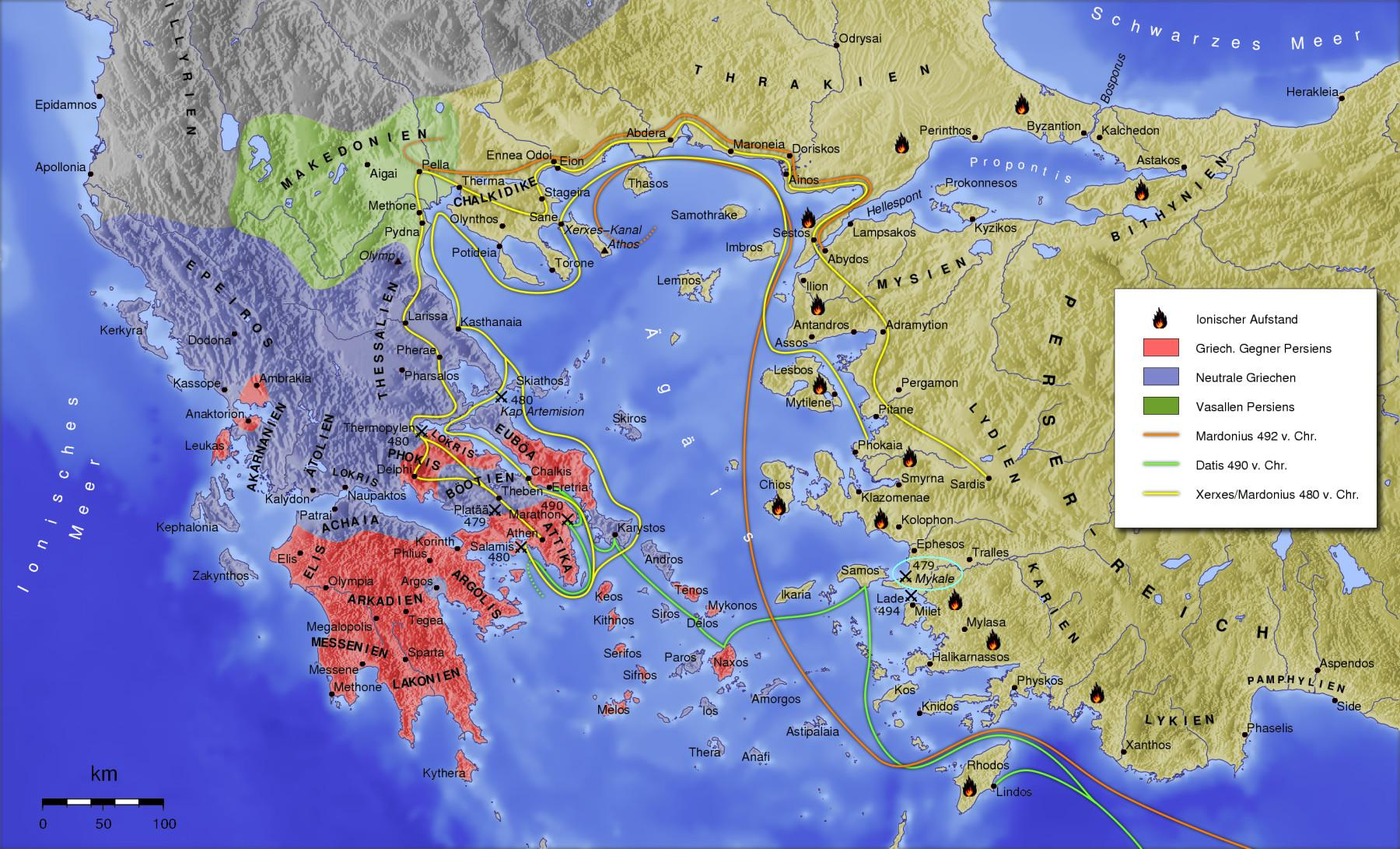
Map of Xerxes' invasion of Greece, showing the Persian march through Thrace (yellow) and the battle of Mycale (circled in blue).

Masistes was one of the six chief marshals of the Greek campaigns of Xerxes (480-479 BC). Along with general Mardonius, he commanded the army column that crossed Thrace along the coast; however, he was almost completely absent during the course of the war, including the battles of Salamis and Plataea.

He reappeared close to the end of the war, when he fought in the Battle of Mycale (479 BC). According to Herodotus, the battle was just about to take place at sea, but the Persians decided to come ashore in Ionia, Asia Minor, and fight on land. The Greek and the Persian armies finally fought in Mycale, and the Persians were completely defeated. Commanders Tigranes and Mardontes died during the battle, but Artayntes and Itamithres, as well as Masistes, managed to escape. According to Herodotus, on their way to Sardis, where the king stayed, Masistes accused Artayntes of cowardice and blamed him of being "worse than a woman". In response, Artayntes unsheathed his sword and tried to kill Masistes, but was stopped by a Carian named Xenagoras of Halicarnassus.

Masistes' family stayed near the battle, in Sardis, Lydia, which was a common practice of the nobility of the Persian Empire. In Herodotus' Histories, he comments that while Masistes was fighting, his brother, king Xerxes, seduced Masistes' wife (see below).

== Love affairs and Masistes' revolt ==
=== The tale ===
Masistes is one of the main characters in a bloody episode in Herodotus' Histories (IX 108–110). Herodotus relates that, after his defeat in Greece, Xerxes fell in love with the wife of Masistes, but failed in all attempts to win her favour. In order to be closer to his sister-in-law, Xerxes married his son Darius to his niece Artaynte, a daughter of Masistes. The wedding was celebrated in Sardis, but when the court returned to Susa, Xerxes decided that he desired the daughter rather than the mother, and Artaynte became his lover. One day, Xerxes visited Artaynte wearing a robe that had been woven by queen Amestris. He offered Artaynte to grant her whatever wish she desired. She chose the robe, and when she wore it in public, the affair was discovered.

When Amestris heard the news she sought revenge, not from Artaynte, strangely enough, but from her mother, the wife of Masistes. It was customary in Persia that on the king's birthday he had to grant all the wishes he was asked, so Amestris waited until that date to ask Xerxes to give her Masistes' wife, clearly with nefarious intent. To facilitate this, Xerxes entreated his brother to relinquish his wife, in favour of a daughter of Xerxes; Masistes refused, saying he was happy with his wife, and that a man his equal could easily be found to marry Xerxes's daughter. At this Xerxes was angered, and told Masistes that he was no longer welcome to marry his daughter, but nevertheless would relinquish his wife. Masistes had heard enough and left. At this same time, under Amestris' orders, Masistes' wife was tortured and mutilated: her breasts, nose, ears, lips were cut off and her tongue cut out. When Masistes saw his mutilated wife he fled to Bactria to start a revolt; however, he was intercepted on his way by troops sent by the king, and put to death along with his followers and his three sons.

=== Historical background ===
The tale refers to an ill-fated attempt of Masistes to lead a revolt against his brother Xerxes. Although the exact date is unknown, it could not have happened too long after the battle of Mycale (479 BC), perhaps in 478 BC.

It was originally considered that Xerxes, affected by his defeats in Greece, became involved in harem intrigues that would cause turmoil in the court and eventually result in the decadence and ruin of the Empire. This view is widely criticised by more modern authors. Many of the episode's themes appear in many legendary tales of Persian origin - the plot is the same, only the names of the characters are changed. Thus, although the tale is based on Persian oral accounts of Masistes' revolt, it is impossible to consider it as a historical fact and to derive literal conclusions from it.

Relating to this, it has been argued that the royal robe (which Amestris wove for Xerxes in the story) was not just a piece of clothing but a symbol of the Persian monarchy. According to this reasoning, and within the symbolic context of Persian culture of this period, when Artaynte asked Xerxes for his robe she was actually asking for the throne, although not for her, as she was married to the heir, prince Darius, but perhaps for her father Masistes. This could explain why Amestris punished Masistes' wife instead of her daughter Artaynte. It has also been noted that the punishment that Masistes' wife received was usually reserved for rebels.

Other legendary Persian episodes share the theme of the royal robe, amongst these:

- Cyrus the Great receives the royal Mede robe when he marries the daughter of Mede king Astyages (Xenophon, Cyropaedia VIII 5 18).
- Cyrus the Younger is just about to kill his brother, king Artaxerxes II, but stops when he sees him dressing himself with the royal robe (Plutarch, Artoxerxes III 1–4).
- During a hunting expedition, nobleman Tiribazus wears the royal robe of king Artaxerxes II, causing disgust amongst his courtiers, as it is forbidden (Plutarch, Artoxerxes V 2).

== Masistes and mathishta ==
It has been noted that the name Masistes (which the Greek sources give) is related to the Old Persian title mathishta (maθišta, "the greatest", "the highest", "the longest"; "chief [of the troop]"; as a title, "the greatest after the king", "the second after the king") given to the royal heir designated by the king. The problem lies in that the heir designated by Darius I is Xerxes, not Masistes, although the succession was not free of conflict. According to Herodotus, the eldest son by Darius was Artabazanes, but he had been born prior to Darius' ascent to the throne. Xerxes was the first-born son of Darius after he was crowned king, and he was also son of Atossa, the daughter of Cyrus the Great, founder of the empire. After many disputes in the court, Darius finally chose Xerxes. This is corroborated by Xerxes himself, who in his "Harem Inscription" of Persepolis states that his father designated him mathishta despite having other sons.

Pompeius Trogus, a later author, relates the same story, but refers to Artabazanes as Ariamenes. On the other hand, Plutarch states that Xerxes, when he is chosen as heir, offers Ariamenes the position of "second after the king". The Ariamenes who appears in Plutarch, although he plays the role of the Artabazanes referred to by Herodotus and the Ariamenes referred to by Trogus, has similarities with Masistes. First, Ariamenes governs over Bactria in Plutarch's version, just as Masistes does in Herodotus. Also, the phrase "second after the king" coincides with the meaning of the title mathishta, which seems to be related to the name of Masistes. However, in Plutarch, the "second after the king" refers to the most powerful person after the king himself, but not to the heir, as occurs with the title mathishta.

It is possible, as it has been argued, that Masistes was not the real name of the younger brother of Xerxes, but simply his title, (mathishta). Facing this possibility, Masistes was in fact a given name used at the time. In a clay cuneiform tablet ( a commercial document, specifically) from the Babylonian city of Nippur dated to 429 BC (during Artaxerxes I's reign) mention is made of a certain Masishtu (Masištu), whose name has been identified as the Akkadian form of Masistes.
