= Grammoechus strenuus =

Scientific classification
- Kingdom: Animalia
- Phylum: Arthropoda
- Clade: Pancrustacea
- Class: Insecta
- Order: Coleoptera
- Suborder: Polyphaga
- Infraorder: Cucujiformia
- Family: Cerambycidae
- Genus: Grammoechus
- Species: G. strenuus

Binomial name
- Grammoechus strenuus (Thomson, 1864)

Synonyms
- Atossa strenua Thomson, 1864

Species of beetle

Grammoechus strenuus is a species of beetle in the family Cerambycidae. It was described by James Thomson in 1864, originally under the genus Atossa. It is known from Java.
