= Amestris =

Achaemenid Empire Queen consort

Queen consort of the Achaemenid Empire
- Died: 424 BC
- Spouse: Xerxes I
- Issue: Darius; Hystaspes; Artaxerxes I Rhodogune; Amytis
- House: Achaemenid
- Father: Otanes
- Religion: Zoroastrianism

Amestris (Greek: Άμηστρις, Amēstris, perhaps the same as Άμαστρις, Amāstris, from Old Persian Amāstrī-, "strong woman") was an Achaemenid queen, wife of king Xerxes I and mother of king Artaxerxes I. She was one of the influential women of the Achaemenid era, extremely powerful and vindictive.

She was poorly regarded by ancient Greek historians.

== Life ==
Amestris was the daughter of Otanes, one of the seven noblemen reputed to have killed the magus who was impersonating King Bardiya in 522 BC. After this, Darius I the Great of Persia assumed the throne. According to Herodotus, Otanes was honoured with royal marriages. Darius I married Otanes' daughter Phaedymia while Otanes married a sister of Darius, who gave birth to Amestris.

When Darius died in 486 BC, Amestris was married to the crown prince, Xerxes. Herodotus describes Amestris as a cruel despot:

I am informed that Amestris, the wife of Xerxes, when she had grown old, made return for her own life to the god who is said to be beneath the earth by burying twice seven children of Persians who were men of renown.

— Herodotus, Histories 7.114

However, the story is not supported by any primary source. The origin of this story is unclear, since known records and accounts indicate that human sacrifices were not permitted within the Persian religion. Also since most accounts of the time are from Greek sources, and due to the involvement of Greece as an opponent of Persia, it is possible that not all accounts are accurate.

Circa 478 BC, her son Crown Prince Darius was married to his cousin Artaynte at Sardis. She was the daughter of Xerxes' brother Masistes. Artaynte committed adultery with Xerxes at his behest. When Amestris found out, she did not seek revenge against Artaynte, but against her mother, Masistes' wife, as Amestris thought that it was her connivance. On Xerxes' birthday, Amestris sent for his guards and mutilated Masistes' wife by cutting off her breasts and threw them to dogs, and her nose and ears and lips also, and cutting out her tongue as well. On seeing this, Masistes fled to Bactria to start a revolt, but was intercepted by Xerxes' army who killed him and his sons.

The story of Amestris torturing the physician Apollonides of Kos for a misdemeanor is considered historically doubtful.

Amestris outlived Xerxes, remaining active in royal affairs during the long reign of their son Artaxerxes I. She died in early 424 BC, aged nearly ninety, with Artaxerxes himself dying soon after.

== Political life ==
"Amastris, the first lady of Xerxes' court, was one of the most formidable and ruthless women of her time. Although many of the actions attributed to her by Greek historians cannot be fully accepted, the surviving evidence points to her psychological strength and authority. She was the daughter of Otanes, one of the notable Persians, from the Achaemenid family, and throughout her life, she wielded power and influence over the Achaemenid court with all her effort and ability."

"After the death of Atossa, Amastris, the wife of Xerxes, whom Greek writers such as Herodotus describe as a powerful yet ruthless and cold-hearted woman, played the leading role in Xerxes' court. Amastris also accompanied him during his military campaign against Greece."

After the death of Xerxes, she also held extraordinary influence in the court of her son, Artaxerxes I, serving as queen mother."

"During the long reign of Artaxerxes I, the real power of the kingdom was largely in her hands. The young king, Artaxerxes I, was kind-hearted and heavily influenced by his mother, Amastris, and his sister, Amestris."Government officials did not consider her separate from the king, and everywhere her orders were obeyed. Amastris lived a long life, and her authority and respect remained intact until the very end."

Amastris ranked among the foremost Persians in terms of lineage and wealth.

== Genealogy ==
Hystaspes
Darius I 522–486 BCE	A daughter	Otanes
Masistes	Xerxes I 486–465 BCE	Amestris
Artaynte	Darius	Hystaspes	Artaxerxes I 465–424 BCE	Achaemenes (?)	Rhodogune	Amytis

== Popular depictions ==
Amestris is a character in the opera Serse by George Frideric Handel (italianized as "Amastre"). In the opera, Amestris is about to marry Xerxes (Serse), yet he falls in love with another woman and wants to marry her instead. Amestris disguises herself as a man in order to be near him. At the end of the opera, Xerxes is sorry for the things he did and asks Amestris once more to be his wife.

In the manga Fullmetal Alchemist, the fictional country the story takes place in is named Amestris.

== Sources ==
- Amestris by Jona Lendering
