= Artaynte =

Wife of 5th-century BC Achaemenid Crown Prince Darius

Artaynte (f. 478 BC), was the wife of the Crown Prince Darius, son of the king Xerxes I.

== Life ==
What we know of Artaynte primarily comes from the writings of Herodotus. She was the daughter of an unnamed woman and Prince Masistes, who was a marshall of the armies during the invasion of Greece in 480-479 BC, and was also the brother of King Xerxes I.

During the Greek campaign Xerxes developed a passionate desire for the wife of his brother Masistes, but she would constantly resist and would not bend to his will. Upon returning to Sardis, the king endeavoured to bring about the marriage of his son Darius to Artaynte, the daughter of this woman the wife of Masistes, supposing that by doing so he could obtain Artaynte's mother more easily.

After moving to Susa he brought Artaynte to the royal house with him for his son Darius, but fell in love with her himself, and after obtaining her they became lovers.

At the behest of Xerxes, Artaynte committed adultery with him. When queen Amestris found out, she did not seek revenge against Artaynte, but against her mother, Masistes' wife, as Amestris thought that it was her connivance. On Xerxes' birthday, Amestris sent for his guards and mutilated Masistes' wife by cutting off her breasts and threw them to dogs, and her nose and ears and lips also, and cutting out her tongue as well. On seeing this, Masistes fled to Bactria to start a revolt, but was intercepted by Xerxes' army who killed him and his sons.
