= Artapanus =

Artapanus, also spelled Artapanas, may refer to:

- Artapanus (general), Persian general under Xerxes who fought at the Battle of Thermopylae
- Artapanus of Alexandria, Jewish historian believed to have lived in Alexandria

== See also ==
- Artabanus (disambiguation)
