= Grammoechus spilotus =

Scientific classification
- Domain: Eukaryota
- Kingdom: Animalia
- Phylum: Arthropoda
- Class: Insecta
- Order: Coleoptera
- Suborder: Polyphaga
- Infraorder: Cucujiformia
- Family: Cerambycidae
- Tribe: Pteropliini
- Genus: Grammoechus
- Species: G. spilotus

Binomial name
- Grammoechus spilotus (Gahan, 1906)

Synonyms
- Atossa spilota Gahan, 1906

Species of beetle

Grammoechus spilotus is a species of beetle in the family Cerambycidae, described by Charles Joseph Gahan in 1906 in Malaysia.
