= Grammoechus calamophilus =

Scientific classification
- Domain: Eukaryota
- Kingdom: Animalia
- Phylum: Arthropoda
- Class: Insecta
- Order: Coleoptera
- Suborder: Polyphaga
- Infraorder: Cucujiformia
- Family: Cerambycidae
- Tribe: Pteropliini
- Genus: Grammoechus
- Species: G. calamophilus

Binomial name
- Grammoechus calamophilus Hüdepohl, 1999

Species of beetle

Grammoechus calamophilus is a species of beetle in the family Cerambycidae. It was described by Karl-Ernst Hüdepohl in 1999.
