= Atossa =

Persian Achaemenid empress (550–475 BC)

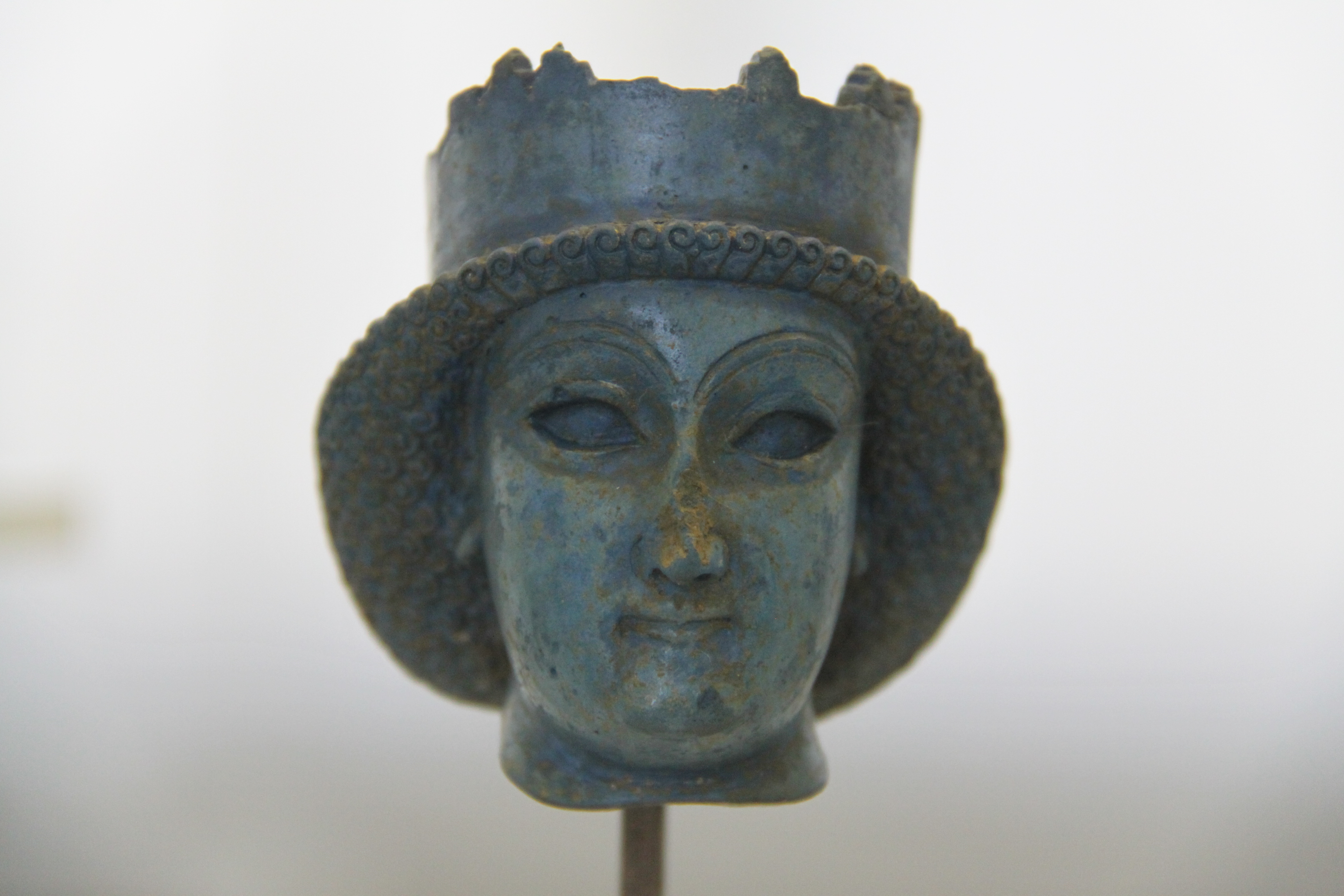

Queen mother of the Achaemenid Empire
- Tenure: 486–476 BC
- Coronation: 486 BC
- Successor: Amestris

Queen consort of the Achaemenid Empire
- Tenure: 520–486 BC
- Coronation: 520 BC
- Predecessor: Cassandane
- Successor: Amestris
- Born: c. 550 BC
- Died: 475 BC
- Burial: Naqsh-e Rostam
- Spouse: Darius the Great
- Issue: Xerxes I Hystaspes; Masistes; Achaemenes
- House: Achaemenid
- Father: Cyrus the Great
- Mother: Cassandane
- Religion: Zoroastrianism

Atossa (Old Persian: Utauθa, or Old Iranian: Hutauθa; 550–475 BC) was an Achaemenid empress. She was the daughter of Cyrus the Great, the sister of Cambyses II as well as his wife until his death, the wife of Darius the Great, the mother of Xerxes the Great and the grandmother of Artaxerxes I. Atossa was undoubtedly the most prominent woman in the history of Iran. During her husband's reign, she had a direct role in state affairs as queen. She played an important role in the history of Iran, serving at the court of Darius the Great. She was a poet and a scholar, teaching Persian literature to young people, and played a leading role in state affairs. Atossa continued to be the foremost lady of the court during the reign of her son, Xerxes. As long as she lived, Xerxes obeyed his mother, and Atossa was the true ruler of the Achaemenid Empire.

== Name ==
The Persian name "Atossa" (or "Atusa") means "bestowing very richly" or "well trickling" or "well granting". Atossa is the Greek (Ancient Greek: Ἄτοσσα) transliteration of the Old Persian name Utauθa. Her name in Avestan is Hutaosā.

Queen Atossa is the most famous bearer of this name, however, the name Atossa appears to have been a traditional one within the Achaemenid clan. According to the genealogy of the Kings of Cappadocia, the name Atossa was also borne by a sister of Cambyses I and sister-wife of Artaxerxes II.

== Early life ==
Atossa was born in 550 BCE as the eldest daughter of Cyrus the Great and his wife Cassandane. Cassandane, an Achaemenian and the daughter of Pharnaspes, bore Cyrus two sons, Cambyses II and Bardiya, as well as three daughters: Atossa, Artystone, and Roxane. Cyrus and Cassandane were known to share a deeply loving relationship. Following the death of Cyrus, both Atossa and Artystone were married to Darius the Great.

== Marriage ==
Atossa was first married to her brother, Cambyses II, the son and successor of Cyrus the Great, as his first consort. In Achaemenid Persia, marriages between close family members, such as half-siblings, nieces, and cousins, were not uncommon and were not regarded as incestuous, yet brother-sister and father-daughter marriages were frowned upon. According to Herodotus, Cambyses supposedly married two of his sisters, Atossa and Roxane. This would have been regarded as illegal. However, Herodotus also states that Cambyses married Otanes' daughter Phaidyme, whilst his contemporary Ctesias names Roxane as Cambyses' wife, but she is not referred to as his sister. Hence it remains problematic to determine the reliability of these accounts.

Accusations against Cambyses for committing incest are used as a way to vilify him: painting him as mad and vain. This is a common historiographical issue faced in many older historical texts on Persia. For example, one of the primary records of his incestuous acts is from an Egyptian text which antagonizes many of his actions, far beyond incest. However, many of the allegations within the text, such as the killing of the Apis bull, have been confirmed as false, which means that the report of Cambyses' supposed incestuous acts are also contestable.

Atossa bore no children with Cambyses, and his reign concluded abruptly with his death in the spring or summer of 522 BCE.

Following Cambyses’ death, the empire entered a period of political instability. A usurper named Gaumata , who claimed to be Bardiya (Cambyses’ younger brother and the son of Cyrus the Great), seized power. Bardiya’s death was not known to the public, which allowed Gaumata, a Magian priest from Media, to proclaim himself king near the Persian town of Paishiyauvada. During this tumultuous period, Atossa was passed into Gaumata’s harem. This situation was short-lived however, as Darius the Great overthrew Gaumata, took possession of the harem and claimed the throne. To legitimize his rule, Darius took wives from the noblest houses of Persia, marrying Cyrus' daughters Atossa and Artystone, as well as Parmys, Atossa’s niece. Atossa was granted the status of Darius’ primary consort and queen.

In Histories, Herodotus referred to Atossa as a woman who had been a wife of her brother Cambyses and afterwards of the Magus, while he described Artystone as a virgin. According to Herodotus, Artystone was Darius’ favourite wife, yet Atossa wielded considerably more influence in the Achaemenid Court, and it was Atossa’s son Xerxes I who succeeded Darius’ throne. Darius the Great and Atossa shared a common great-great grandfather Teispes, the King of Anshan, who ruled from 675 to 640 BCE. Teispes was the son of Achaemenes, the eponymous founder of the Achaemenid dynasty. Darius himself was a distant relative with the family of Cyrus but not a direct descendant. Darius and Atossa’s union was politically significant, as it connected Darius to the lineage of Cyrus the Great, thereby reinforcing his claim to the throne. Scholars have argued that Darius’ marriage to Atossa was motivated by a desire to legitimize his collateral Achaemenid line by aligning himself with the family of Cyrus, the empire’s founder.

Atossa and Darius had four sons: Xerxes, Hystaspes, Masistes, and Achaemenes. Xerxes, the eldest, succeeded Darius as King of Kings, ruling the Achaemenid Empire from 486 to 465 BCE. Hystaspes commanded the Bactrian and Saka troops in Xerxes’ army, Masistes served as one of Xerxes’ leading generals, and Achaemenes was appointed admiral of the Egyptian fleet. According to Herodotus in Histories IX, Atossa’s sons Xerxes and Masistes shared a deeply troubled and deteriorated relationship as Xerxes fell in love with the wife of Masistes, but eventually brutally ordered her to be mutilated and killed. This prompted Masistes to start a revolt against Xerxes in 478 BC, which eventually led to his execution along with his followers and three sons.

Atossa remained married to Darius until his death in 486 BCE. Both were buried at Naqsh-e Rustam, the royal necropolis of the Achaemenid kings.

== Political Influence ==
Atossa wielded significant influence due to her lineage, intelligence, and status as the daughter of Cyrus the Great and wife of Darius I. According to Herodotus, Atossa, motivated by her desire to acquire Attic, Argive, and Corinthian maidservants, induced Darius I to launch an expedition against the Greeks. At her instigation a Persian expedition reconnoitered the Greek coasts and surveyed Greek naval power. This expedition, guided by Democedes of Croton—Atossa’s personal physician who treated her breast tumor and Darius’ trusted healer—was successful in gathering intelligence. However, Democedes seized the opportunity to escape, as recounted by Herodotus and Timaeus.

Atossa’s influence extended beyond military strategy to the realm of succession politics. Around 487 BCE, she secured Darius’ support for the succession of her son, Xerxes I, despite him not being the eldest of Darius’ children. Darius had at least twelve sons in total and three sons by his first wife, the daughter of Gobryas, but Atossa’s advocacy ensured Xerxes’ appointment as commander-in-chief of the Persian army, solidifying his position as the heir apparent. The succession was further reinforced by symbolic gestures, such as the placement of a frieze near the northern stairs of the Audience hall (Apadana) of Persepolis as early as 495 BCE, depicting Darius with Xerxes as the crown prince. All Persians who went to celebrate the New Year’s Festival could see the intended successor through the public display.

Following Darius’ death, the transition of power to Xerxes was remarkably smooth. While there was minor unrest in Egypt and Babylonia, there were no significant rebellions comparable to those at the end of Cambyses’ reign. The absence of large-scale civil war can be attributed in part to Atossa’s authority and the legitimacy of her offspring for rulership.

During Xerxes’ reign, Atossa held the esteemed position of queen-mother. Atossa’s unparalleled position in Persian history is underscored by her title as “Lady,” a religious honorific previously granted only to Anahita. Since Atossa, this title was gradually yet still rarely granted to Persian queens.

Atossa’s presence is immortalized in Aeschylus’ tragedy The Persians, where she is portrayed as a central and respected figure. Aeschylus first described Atossa during her entrance in the play as having “light in her eyes like that of gods,” and the chorus referred to her as “supreme among deep-girdled Persian women.” In the play, the late Darius I, summoned from Hades by the chorus, explicitly endorses her influence over Xerxes.

== Powerful Achaemenid woman ==
After the overthrow of the false Bardiya by Darius the Great and seven Persian noble youths, Atossa became the wife of Darius I. Marrying Atossa, who was of Achaemenid lineage, gave legitimacy to Darius’s rule. Furthermore, as Atossa was intelligent, cultured, powerful, and politically astute, she proved to be a valuable support to King Darius whenever needed.

She was the wife of Darius I and held the esteemed position of a great lady both in her father’s court and in her husband’s court, serving as the principal advisor to the King of Persia. Historical records describe Atossa as an influential, learned, and capable woman whose wisdom and knowledge were respected by the nobles, who often consulted her even more than the king himself. From the early years of Darius’s reign and his initial military campaigns to the later years devoted to building and governance, Queen Atossa shared in all matters, responsibilities, and difficulties alongside the king. Being educated and enlightened, she even mastered the new style of writing, and she showed great enthusiasm in the education of court children. Through her guidance, she raised her son Xerxes to become a worthy successor to his father. Atossa undoubtedly held the highest and most superior position compared to others.

Whenever Darius marched to a region with his army, a royal council was formed to manage the affairs of the empire, and at the head of this council, overseeing all, was Atossa, the royal lady. Herodotus writes about her political life: 'Atossa possessed extraordinary power and was eager to accompany her husband even on the battlefield. She was always a strategic supporter of Darius the Great, personally commanding several major battles or contributing to their success through his military plans.' After giving birth to Xerxes, her influence over the king increased.

Atossa was well-versed in reading and writing and played a decisive role in her own education as well as in that of other members of the court.

She was the mother of Darius's first male child, who was recognized as his heir at the beginning of his reign. During the rule of her son Xerxes, she continued to be the foremost lady of the court. As long as she lived, Xerxes obeyed his mother, and Atossa was the true ruler of the Achaemenid Empire. the country’s nobles that Atossa was able to place Xerxes on the throne. From that point on, this wise and prudent woman consistently protected the King of Persia from the intrigues of other princes. Historical records note that Xerxes took pride in the formidable character of his mother, a strength he had inherited from her, so much so that he was sometimes referred to simply as 'the son of Atossa.

It was through the influence she wielded over the country’s nobles that Atossa was able to place Xerxes on the throne. From that point on, this wise and prudent woman consistently protected the King of Persia from the intrigues of other princes. Historical records note that Xerxes took pride in the formidable character of his mother, a strength he had inherited from her, so much so that he was sometimes referred to simply as 'the son of Atossa. During the reign of Xerxes, Atossa, as the king's mother, was actively involved in state affairs.

After Anahita, she was the second woman to receive the title of 'Banu,' a religious honor, as no other woman of her time could match her stature. Such a title was rarely bestowed upon queens.

Atossa’s name appears twice in the tablets. In one tablet, a quantity of barley and wheat is mentioned as being allocated from tax revenue to Queen Atossa.

According to ancient sources, in addition to being skilled in the art of writing, she is also recognized as the first known female poet of Iran. She was a great supporter of Persian education and a poet. She also raised Xerxes, preparing him to inherit the Persian Empire.

== Old Age and Death ==
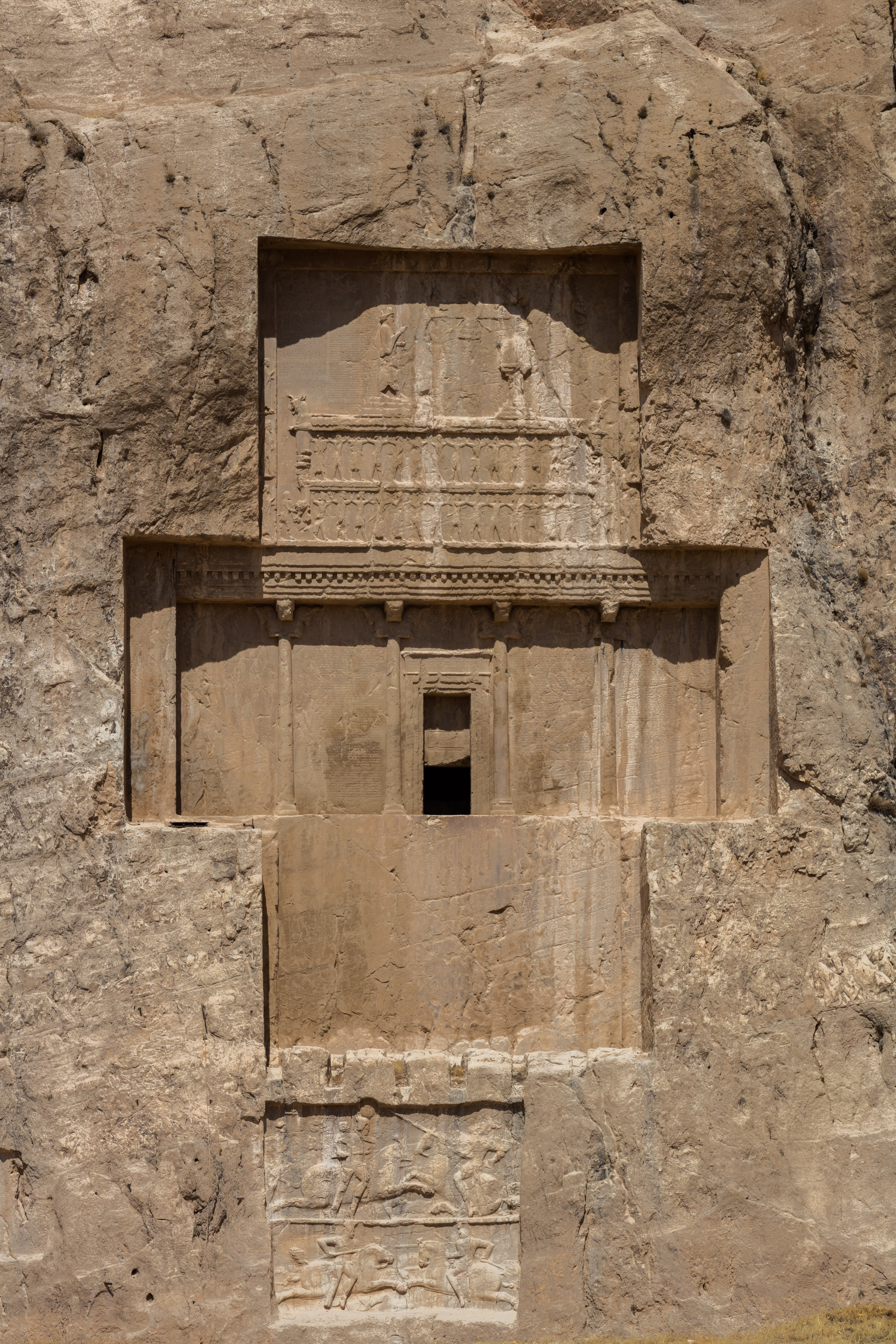
Tomb of Darius the Great, where Atossa was also buried

Nothing is known about Atossa’s death, however, Aeschylus’ The Persians indicates that she was still alive when Xerxes invaded Greece. (The absence of her name in the Persepolis fortification tablets does not necessarily indicate her death at that time, as argued by W. Hinz.) Hence it can be inferred that Atossa lived a long life well into her seventies, until or after Xerxes returned from the Iran-Greece war front in 479 BCE. She was buried at Naqsh-e Rustam, the same royal burial site as Darius the Great and Xerxes I.

== Role in the history of cancer ==
Herodotus records in The Histories that Atossa was troubled with a bleeding lump in her breast. Greek slave and renowned physician, Democedes, excised the tumor. This is the first recorded case of mastitis, sometimes interpreted as a sign of an inflammatory breast cancer.

In The Emperor of All Maladies: A Biography of Cancer by Siddhartha Mukherjee, an Indian-born American physician and oncologist, he imagines Atossa travelling through time, encountering various diagnoses and treatments for her breast cancer. Today, Queen Atossa continues to be the emblematic figure of breast cancer sufferers across history.

== Literary references ==
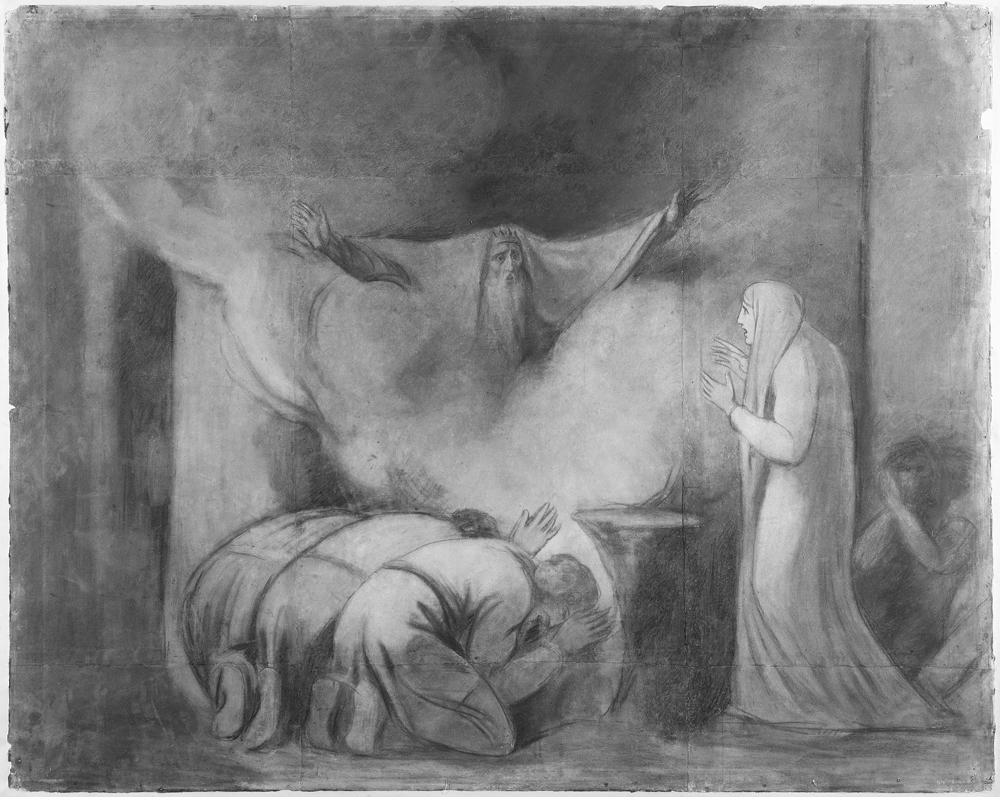
The ghost of Darius appears to Atossa in a scene from The Persians.

Atossa's life and history is recorded by Herodotus in The Histories as a strong woman with considerable influence within the Achaemenid court.

Atossa is a central character in Aeschylus's tragedy The Persians.

She is also one of the major characters in the Gore Vidal's epic historical fiction novel Creation.

Atossa is represented as a breast cancer patient in Siddhartha Mukherjee's book The Emperor of All Maladies.

Dr.Jason Fung references Atossa's inflammatory breast cancer in his book The Cancer Code.

== Legacy ==
Minor planet 810 Atossa discovered by Max Wolf is named in her honor.

Poet Matthew Arnold named his Persian cat "Atossa". She is celebrated in his 1882 poem Poor Matthias, which is about the death of a pet canary.

== Sources ==
- Boyce, Mary (1982). A History of Zoroastrianism: Volume II: Under the Achaemenians. Leiden: Brill. ISBN 9789004065062.
- Mukherjee, Siddhartha (2011). The Emperor of All Maladies: A Biography of Cancer. Harper Collins. ISBN 978-0-00-725092-9.
- Schmitt, R. (1987). "Atossa". Encyclopaedia Iranica, Vol. III, Fasc. 1. pp. 13–14.
