= Grammoechus bipartitus =

Scientific classification
- Kingdom: Animalia
- Phylum: Arthropoda
- Clade: Pancrustacea
- Class: Insecta
- Order: Coleoptera
- Suborder: Polyphaga
- Infraorder: Cucujiformia
- Family: Cerambycidae
- Genus: Grammoechus
- Species: G. bipartitus

Binomial name
- Grammoechus bipartitus Ritsema, 1890

Synonyms
- Atossa vittata Fisher, 1936

Species of beetle

Grammoechus bipartitus is a species of beetle in the family Cerambycidae. It was described by Coenraad Ritsema in 1890. It is known from Java and Borneo.
