= Grammoechus cribripennis =

Scientific classification
- Kingdom: Animalia
- Phylum: Arthropoda
- Class: Insecta
- Order: Coleoptera
- Suborder: Polyphaga
- Infraorder: Cucujiformia
- Family: Cerambycidae
- Genus: Grammoechus
- Species: G. cribripennis

Binomial name
- Grammoechus cribripennis (Breuning, 1936)

Species of beetle

Grammoechus cribripennis is a species of beetle in the family Cerambycidae. It was described by Stephan von Breuning in 1936.
