= Amytis (daughter of Xerxes I) =

Achaemenid princess

Amytis (Old Persian: *ᴴumati; Ancient Greek: Αμυτις Amutis; Latin: Amytis) was an Achaemenid princess, daughter of King Xerxes I and Queen Amestris, and sister of King Artaxerxes I.

== Name ==
The female name Amytis is the Latinised form of the Greek name Amutis (Αμυτις), which hypothetically, with vowel metathesis, reflect an original Old Persian name *ᴴumati, meaning "having good thought," equivalent to the Avestan term humaⁱti (𐬵𐬎𐬨𐬀𐬌𐬙𐬌).

== Life ==
She was given in marriage to the nobleman Megabyzus. Amytis and her mother are portrayed in Ctesias' account as the most powerful women during Artaxerxes' reign.

Near 445 BCE, her husband Megabyzus started a successful revolt in Syria against Artaxerxes I. Initially, Amytis stayed with the king during the war; however, she later participated, along with Amestris and the satrap Artarius, in the reconciliation negotiations between the rebel and the king. Notwithstanding this, Megabyzus again fell in disgrace and was expelled from the court and exiled to a town on the Persian Gulf. After five years in exile, Megabyzus was forgiven and allowed to return to the court, again thanks to the intercession of Amytis and Amestris.

Amytis bore Megabyzus two sons: Zopyrus and Artyphius. After the death of his father and mother, Zopyrus fled to Athens, where, according to Ctesias, he "was well received owing to the services his mother had rendered to the Athenians".

Greek sources portray Amytis as a licentious woman. According to Ctesias, during Xerxes' reign she was accused of adultery by Megabyzus. The same historian further affirms that, after her husband's death, she had a love affair with the Greek physician Apollonides of Cos, and that when the affair was discovered, Apollonides was tortured and put to death by queen mother Amestris. Dinon, another Greek historian, describes Amytis as the most beautiful and licentious woman of Asia. The most difficult challenge in using historians as Ctesias or Dinon as reliable sources is the fact that they tended to write amazing stories that would better appeal to their readers, often without much attention to historical rigor. The lack of primary sources makes it therefore impossible to have an accurate image of Amytis. Similarly, Amestris torture of the physician is considered historically doubtful.

== Classical references ==
- Photius' epitome of Ctesias account: 24, 26, 33, 34, 42 -45.
- Dinon, cited by Athenaeus of Naucratis: Deipnosophistae 13. 89, where her name is misspelled as Anoutis.

== Bibliography ==
- Brosius, M (1998): Women in Ancient Persia, 559-331 BC, Clarendon Press, Oxford.
- Lendering, J: "Megabyzus (2) Archived 2014-07-25 at the Wayback Machine", at http://www.livius.org
- Sancisi-Weerdenburg, H (1987): "Decadence in the empire or decadence in the sources. From source to synthesis: Ctesias", in H. Sancisi-Weerdenburg (ed.), Achaemenid History I: Sources, Structures and Synthesis. Proceedings of the Groningen 1983 Achaemenid History Workshop.
- Schmitt, R. (1989). "AMYTIS". Encyclopædia Iranica.
