= Grammoechus assamensis =

Scientific classification
- Kingdom: Animalia
- Phylum: Arthropoda
- Class: Insecta
- Order: Coleoptera
- Suborder: Polyphaga
- Infraorder: Cucujiformia
- Family: Cerambycidae
- Genus: Grammoechus
- Species: G. assamensis

Binomial name
- Grammoechus assamensis (Breuning, 1935)

Species of beetle

Grammoechus assamensis is a species of beetle in the family Cerambycidae. It was described by Stephan von Breuning in 1935.
