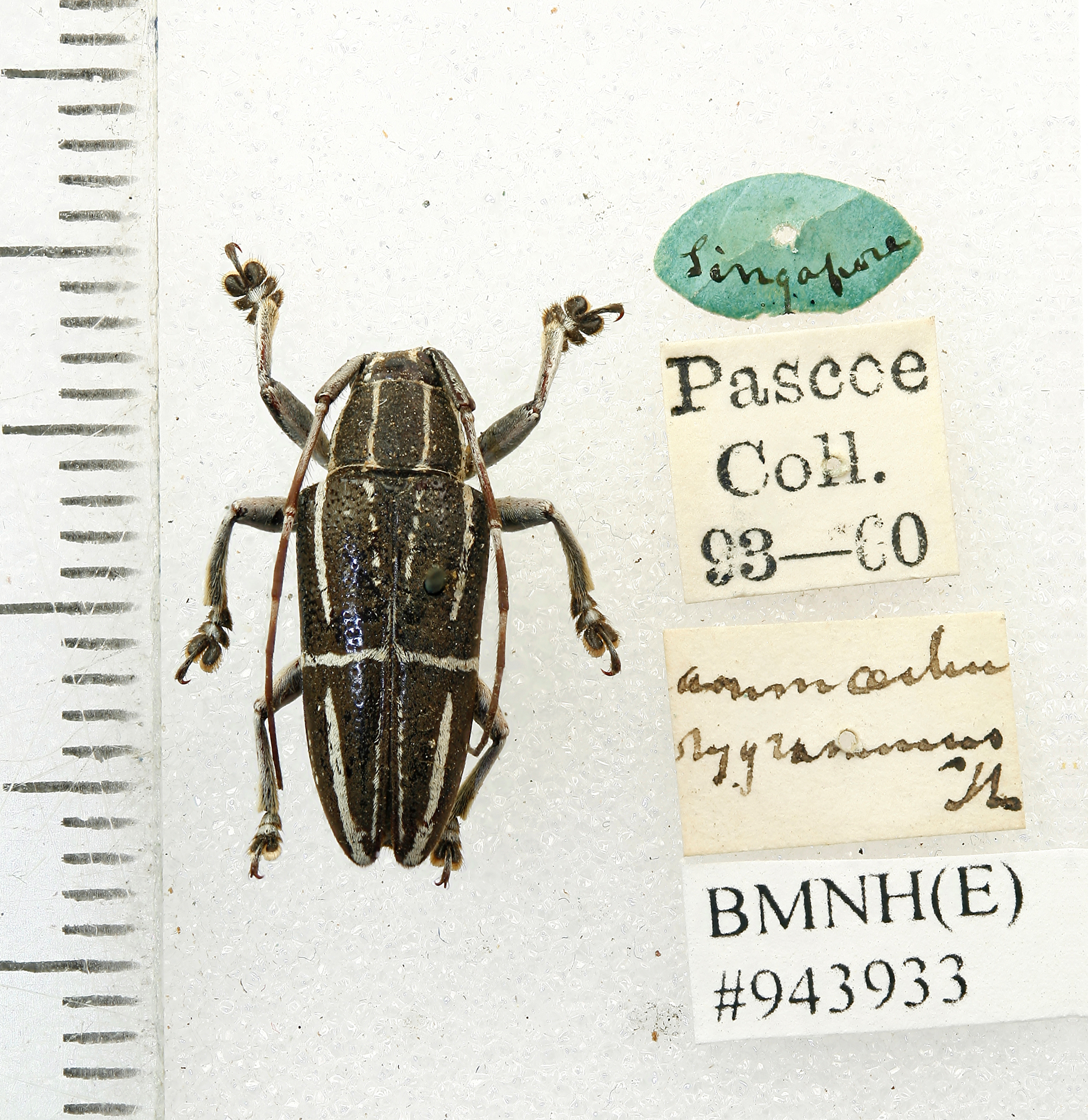
- Grammoechus polygrammus

Scientific classification
- Domain: Eukaryota
- Kingdom: Animalia
- Phylum: Arthropoda
- Class: Insecta
- Order: Coleoptera
- Suborder: Polyphaga
- Infraorder: Cucujiformia
- Family: Cerambycidae
- Tribe: Pteropliini
- Genus: Grammoechus
- Species: G. polygrammus

Binomial name
- Grammoechus polygrammus J. Thomson, 1864

= Grammoechus polygrammus =

Species of beetle

Grammoechus polygrammus is a species of beetle in the family Cerambycidae. It was described by James Thomson in 1864.

== Subspecies ==
- Grammoechus polygrammus polygrammus J. Thomson, 1864
- Grammoechus polygrammus siporensis Breuning, 1939
