= Apollonides of Cos =

Ancient Greek physician and surgeon

Apollonides (Ancient Greek: Ἀπολλωνίδης) was a Greek physician and surgeon from Cos. Like many other of his kinsmen, he went to serve at the court of the Persian Empire, then ruled by Artaxerxes Longimanus (465–425 BC).

According to Ctesias, at the court he cured Megabyzus, the king's brother-in-law, of a dangerous wound, but was afterwards engaged in a sinful and scandalous amour with his wife, Amytis, who was herself a most profligate woman. For this offence Apollonides was given up by Artaxerxes into the hands of his mother, Amestris, who tortured him for about two months, and at last, upon the death of her daughter, ordered him to be buried alive. Modern historians consider the description of the queen's actions as doubtful.

== Notes ==
=== References ===
- Brosius, M (1998): Women in Ancient Persia, pp. 73, 74, 113, 114.
