= Grammoechus ligatus =

Scientific classification
- Kingdom: Animalia
- Phylum: Arthropoda
- Clade: Pancrustacea
- Class: Insecta
- Order: Coleoptera
- Suborder: Polyphaga
- Infraorder: Cucujiformia
- Family: Cerambycidae
- Genus: Grammoechus
- Species: G. ligatus

Binomial name
- Grammoechus ligatus Pascoe, 1888

Synonyms
- Atossa subspecularis Heller, 1923; Phemone cordiger Ritsema, 1890

Species of beetle

Grammoechus ligatus is a species of beetle in the family Cerambycidae. It was described by Francis Polkinghorne Pascoe in 1888. It is known from Sumatra and Borneo.
