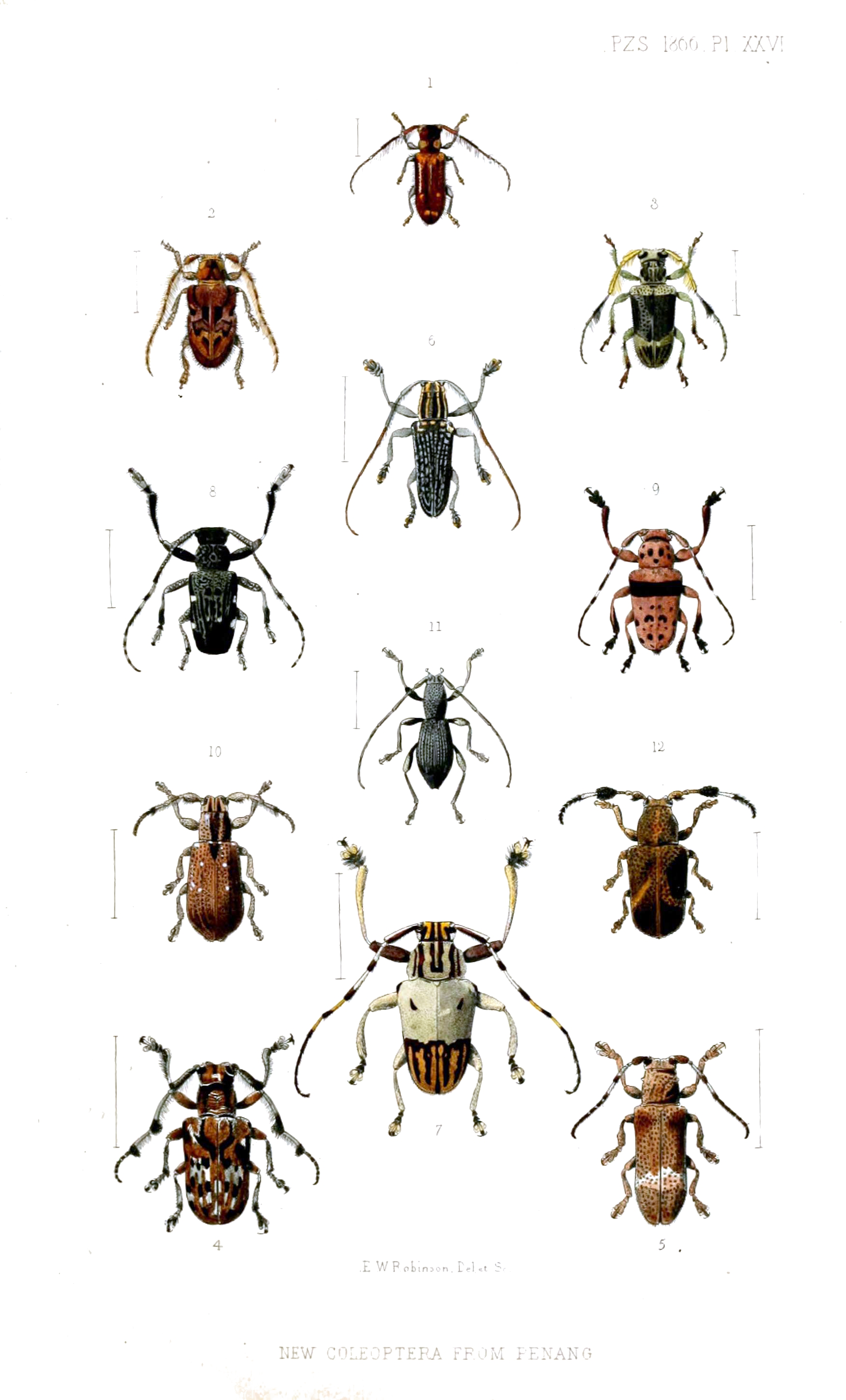
- Grammoechus atomarius (fig. 6)

Scientific classification
- Kingdom: Animalia
- Phylum: Arthropoda
- Class: Insecta
- Order: Coleoptera
- Suborder: Polyphaga
- Infraorder: Cucujiformia
- Family: Cerambycidae
- Genus: Grammoechus
- Species: G. atomarius

Binomial name
- Grammoechus atomarius (Pascoe, 1866)

Synonyms
- Atossa atomaria Pascoe, 1866

= Grammoechus atomarius =

Species of beetle

Grammoechus atomarius is a species of beetle in the family Cerambycidae. It was described by Francis Polkinghorne Pascoe in 1866. It is known from Malaysia.
