= Grammoechus leucosticticus =

Scientific classification
- Kingdom: Animalia
- Phylum: Arthropoda
- Class: Insecta
- Order: Coleoptera
- Suborder: Polyphaga
- Infraorder: Cucujiformia
- Family: Cerambycidae
- Genus: Grammoechus
- Species: G. leucosticticus

Binomial name
- Grammoechus leucosticticus (Breuning, 1938)

Synonyms
- Atossa leucostictica Breuning, 1936

Species of beetle

Grammoechus leucosticticus is a species of beetle in the family Cerambycidae. It was described by Stephan von Breuning in 1938. It is known from Borneo.
