= Grammoechus javanicus =

Scientific classification
- Kingdom: Animalia
- Phylum: Arthropoda
- Clade: Pancrustacea
- Class: Insecta
- Order: Coleoptera
- Suborder: Polyphaga
- Infraorder: Cucujiformia
- Family: Cerambycidae
- Genus: Grammoechus
- Species: G. javanicus

Binomial name
- Grammoechus javanicus Breuning, 1938

Species of beetle

Grammoechus javanicus is a species of beetle in the family Cerambycidae. It was described by Stephan von Breuning in 1938. It is known from Java and Borneo.
