= Grammoechus triangulifer =

Scientific classification
- Kingdom: Animalia
- Phylum: Arthropoda
- Class: Insecta
- Order: Coleoptera
- Suborder: Polyphaga
- Infraorder: Cucujiformia
- Family: Cerambycidae
- Genus: Grammoechus
- Species: G. triangulifer

Binomial name
- Grammoechus triangulifer (Ritsema, 1908)

Synonyms
- Phemone triangulifer Ritsema, 1908

Species of beetle

Grammoechus triangulifer is a species of beetle in the family Cerambycidae. It was described by Ritsema in 1908. It is known from Borneo.
