= Jason Fung =

Canadian physician (born 1973)

- Born: 1973 (age 52–53)
- Education: University of Toronto; University of California, Los Angeles
- Occupations: Nephrologist, writer

Jason Fung (born in 1973) is a Canadian nephrologist and low-carbohydrate diet advocate who promotes intermittent and extended fasting.

== Biography ==
Fung graduated with his medical degree from the University of Toronto and completed his residency and fellowship in nephrology at the University of California, Los Angeles.

Fung is an author of books advocating fasting and low-carbohydrate high-fat diets. His first book, The Complete Guide to Fasting co-authored by Jimmy Moore was published in 2016 and offered insight to all aspects of fasting culture. The Obesity Code and The Diabetes Code were subsequently published in 2016 and 2018. His book The Obesity Code Cookbook was published in 2019. In 2020, Fung co-authored with naturopath Nadia Brito Pateguana The PCOS Plan: Prevent and Reverse Polycystic Ovary Syndrome Through Diet and Fasting. His book The Cancer Code, published in 2020 advocates intermittent fasting and a low-carbohydrate diet to reduce cancer risk. In 2021, Fung co-authored The Diabetes Code Cookbook with Alison Maclean. Fung has suggested that there is "nothing wrong" with fasts of up to a month.

Fung is the director of the non-profit organization Public Health Collaboration. He is an advocate of functional medicine.

== Reception ==
Renza Scibilia in Clinical Diabetes commented that Fung's claim that all the current evidence-based, conventional treatments are wrong for type 2 diabetes is obviously false. Scibilia endorses Fung's dietary management advise as one option to treat or prevent diabetes for those who can sustain it and appreciates its simplicity and clarity as appealing and practical for some patients, while regarding it as too strict for other patients to sustain.

Fung's book The Obesity Code received a 31% score for scientific accuracy and an overall score of 60% by Red Pen Reviews. Reviewer Seth Yoder commented that several of the main claims of the book are poorly supported by science including the idea that elevated levels of insulin are the primary cause of obesity. Yoder concluded that intermittent fasting may be useful for weight loss, "but most people will not find it as effective as claimed in the book".

Fung's book The Diabetes Code received a 33% score for scientific accuracy at Red Pen Reviews. Reviewer Shaun Ward commented that the benefits of a low-carbohydrate and harms of sugar and medication were overstated by Fung and that although the dietary advice may be effective for managing type 2 diabetes it is unlikely to be sustainable for most people.

== Publications ==
=== Books ===
- The Complete Guide to Fasting (2016)
- The Obesity Code: Unlocking the Secrets of Weight Loss (2016)
- The Diabetes Code (2018)
- The Obesity Code Cookbook (2019)
- The Longevity Solution (2019)
- The PCOS Plan: Prevent and Reverse Polycystic Ovary Syndrome Through Diet and Fasting (2020)
- The Cancer Code (2020)
- Life in the Fasting Lane (2020)
- The Diabetes Code Cookbook (2021)
- The Hunger Code: Resetting Your Body's Fat Thermostat in the Age of Ultra-Processed Food (The Follow-up to The Obesity Code) (2026)

=== Academic papers ===
- Therapeutic fasting as a potential effective treatment for type 2 diabetes: A 4-month case study.
- Hyperinsulinemia and Insulin Resistance: Scope of the Problem.
- Therapeutic use of intermittent fasting for people with type 2 diabetes as an alternative to insulin.
