= Artapanus (general) =

Persian general under Xerxes I

- Allegiance: Achaemenid Empire
- Battles / wars: Greco-Persian Wars: Battle of Thermopylae

Artapanus (Greek: Αρτάπανος) was a Persian General under Xerxes I. He was the son of Artasyras, the chief of the Hyrcarnians. According to Ctesias' Persica, Artapanus led the first wave of Persians against the Spartan force at the Battle of Thermopylae in 480 BC. Although he led a force of 10,000 men, they were routed by the Spartan defenders.

Artapanus is not mentioned by name in Herodotus' history of the battle.

== See also ==
- Artabanus of Persia
