= Grammoechus =

Scientific classification
- Domain: Eukaryota
- Kingdom: Animalia
- Phylum: Arthropoda
- Class: Insecta
- Order: Coleoptera
- Suborder: Polyphaga
- Infraorder: Cucujiformia
- Family: Cerambycidae
- Tribe: Pteropliini
- Genus: Grammoechus

Synonyms
- Atossa J. Thomson, 1864; Paratossa Breuning, 1935

Genus of beetles

Grammoechus is a genus of longhorn beetles of the subfamily Lamiinae, containing the following species:

subgenus Grammoechus

- Grammoechus atomarius (Pascoe, 1866)
- Grammoechus bipartitus Ritsema, 1890
- Grammoechus calamophilus Hüdepohl, 1999
- Grammoechus cribripennis (Breuning, 1936)
- Grammoechus javanicus Breuning, 1938
- Grammoechus leucosticticus (Breuning, 1938)
- Grammoechus ochreovariegatus Breuning, 1957
- Grammoechus polygrammus J. Thomson, 1864
- Grammoechus seriatus Holzschuh, 2003
- Grammoechus strenuus (Thomson, 1864)
- Grammoechus tagax Holzschuh, 2003

subgenus Paratossa

- Grammoechus albosparsus Breuning, 1947
- Grammoechus assamensis (Breuning, 1935)
- Grammoechus ligatus Pascoe, 1888
- Grammoechus spilotus (Gahan, 1906)
- Grammoechus triangulifer (Ritsema, 1908)
