= 810 Atossa =

Main-belt asteroid

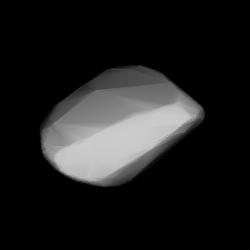
- Shape model of Atossa from its lightcurve

Discovery
- Discovered by: M. F. Wolf
- Discovery site: Heidelberg Obs.
- Discovery date: 8 September 1915

Designations
- Pronunciation: /əˈtɒsə/
- Named after: Atossa (550–475 BC) (Persian queen)
- Alternative designations: A915 RS · 1931 PF; 1934 NB · 1947 PA; 1915 XQ
- Minor planet category: main-belt · (inner); background · Flora

Orbital characteristics
- Epoch 31 May 2020 (JD 2459000.5)
- Uncertainty parameter 0
- Observation arc: 104.41 yr (38,136 d)
- Aphelion: 2.5717 AU
- Perihelion: 1.7853 AU
- Semi-major axis: 2.1785 AU
- Eccentricity: 0.1805
- Orbital period (sidereal): 3.22 yr (1,174 d)
- Mean anomaly: 198.29°
- Mean motion: 0° 18^{m} 23.4^{s} / day
- Inclination: 2.6122°
- Longitude of ascending node: 152.69°
- Argument of perihelion: 195.84°

Physical characteristics
- Mean diameter: 8.104±0.119 km
- Synodic rotation period: 4.3851±0.0004 h
- Pole ecliptic latitude: (12.0°, 67.0°) (λ_{1}/β_{1}); (188.0°, 69.0°) (λ_{2}/β_{2})
- Geometric albedo: 0.224±0.046
- Spectral type: S (assumed)
- Absolute magnitude (H): 12.5; 12.70

810 Atossa (prov. designation: A915 RS or 1915 XQ) is a bright and elongated background asteroid from the region of the Flora family, located in the inner portion of the asteroid belt. It was discovered on 8 September 1915, by German astronomer Max Wolf at the Heidelberg-Königstuhl State Observatory in southern Germany. The presumed S-type asteroid has a rotation period of 4.4 hours and measures approximately 8 kilometers (5 miles) in diameter. It was named after the ancient Persian queen Atossa (550–475 BC).

== Orbit and classification ==
Atossa is a non-family asteroid of the main belt's background population when applying the synthetic hierarchical clustering method (HCM) by Nesvorný to its proper orbital elements. However, in an older HCM-analysis by Zappalà from 1995, this asteroid is considered a member of the Flora family (402), a giant asteroid family and the largest family of stony asteroids in the main-belt. In a third HCM-analysis by Milani and Knežević (AstDyS), it is also a background asteroid, as this analysis does not recognize the Flora asteroid clan as a proper family.

Atossa orbits the Sun in the inner asteroid belt at a distance of 1.8–2.6 AU once every 3 years and 3 months (1,174 days; semi-major axis of 2.18 AU). Its orbit has an eccentricity of 0.18 and an inclination of 3° with respect to the ecliptic. The body's observation arc begins at Heidelberg Observatory with its official discovery observation on 8 September 1915.

== Naming ==
This minor planet was named after Atossa (550–475 BC), an ancient Persian queen, daughter of Cyrus, wife of Darius. The naming was also mentioned in The Names of the Minor Planets by Paul Herget in 1955 (H 80). The asteroids 7209 Cyrus and 7210 Darius were named after her father and husband, respectively.

== Physical characteristics ==
Atossa is assumed to be a stony S-type asteroid, based on its high albedo (see below) and its proximity or potential membership to the stony Flora family.

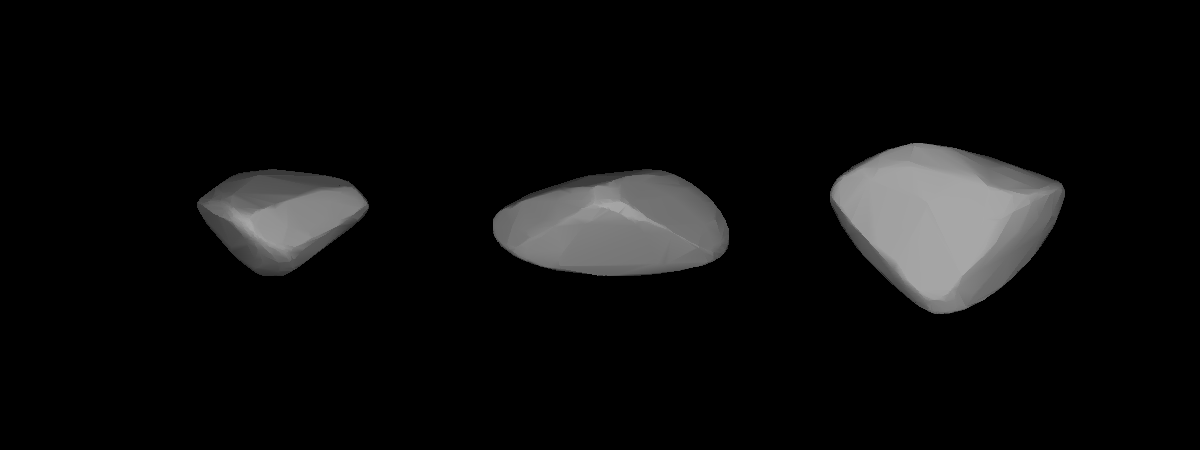
Lightcurve-based 3D-model of Atossa

=== Rotation period ===
In August 2005, a rotational lightcurve of Atossa was obtained from photometric observations by French amateur astronomer Philippe Baudoin. Lightcurve analysis gave a well-defined rotation period of 4.3851±0.0004 hours with a high brightness variation of 0.55±0.01 magnitude, indicative of a non-spherical, elongated shape (U=3).

In 2011, a modeled lightcurve using data from the Uppsala Asteroid Photometric Catalogue (UAPC) and other sources gave a sidereal period of 4.38547±0.00005 hours, as well as two spin axes at (12.0°, 67.0°) and (188.0°, 69.0°) in ecliptic coordinates (λ, β).

=== Diameter and albedo ===
According to the survey carried out by the NEOWISE mission of NASA's Wide-field Infrared Survey Explorer, Atossa measures 8.104±0.119 kilometers in diameter and its surface has an albedo of 0.224±0.046. The Collaborative Asteroid Lightcurve Link assumes a standard albedo for a Florian asteroid of 0.24 and calculates a diameter of 8.58 kilometers based on an absolute magnitude of 12.5. Alternative mean diameter measurements published by the WISE team include (6.99±1.24 km) and (8.356±0.053 km) with corresponding albedos of (0.35±0.17) and (0.2115±0.0097).
