= Hystaspes (son of Xerxes I) =

Second son of Xerxes I of Persia

Hystaspes (Old Persian: 𐎻𐏁𐎫𐎠𐎿𐎱 Vištāspa; Ancient Greek: Ὑστάσπης Hustáspēs) was the second son of the Persian king Xerxes I. When his father was assassinated by the vizier Artabanus, Hystaspes' younger brother Artaxerxes I ascended the throne. According to Diodorus of Sicily, Hystaspes was satrap of Bactria at the time of his father's death. This claim of Diodorus conflicts with the version of Ctesias that an Artaban (not to be confused with the murderer of Xerxes I) then led a revolt in Bactria, where he was satrap. It is possible that the true rebel was Hystaspes.

Hystaspes was allegedly assassinated by Artaxerxes I.

== Bibliography ==
- Margaret C. Miller: Athens and Persia in the Fifth Century BC: A Study in Cultural Receptivity. Cambridge University Press, 2004, ISBN 978-0521607582, S. 14.
