= Dinon =

4th-century BC Greek historian, chronicler, and author

Dinon or Deinon (Greek Δίνων or Δείνων) of Colophon (fl. c. 360 – 340 BC) was a Greek historian and chronicler, the author of a history of Persia, many fragments of which survive. The Suda mistakenly attributes this work to Dio Cassius. He was the father of the historian Cleitarchus.

He wrote a history of Persia titled "The Persian Affairs" of which only a few fragments have survived. He took the history of the near East from where Ctesias left off. While indulging in the taste for the low, his history of Persia was held in considerably more regard than that author's Persica.

His narrative began with the era of the legendary Queen Semiramis and concluded with the Persian reconquest of Egypt. Besides historical events, he described the customs and traditions of the Persians, as well as the luxury, privileges and hierarchy of the court of the Great King. His work also included references to myths, fantastical stories and erotic details. Deinon's work supplemented and expanded the similar and earlier work of Ctesias, divided, like Ctesias', into three parts (Assyriaca, Medica, and Persica).

In antiquity, Deinon was considered a notable author and a reliable source for Persian history, according to the Roman biographer Cornelius Nepos. Plutarch used him as a primary source for his "Life of Artaxerxes," and also mentioned him in the "Life of Themistocles."

Deinon was also referenced by Athenaeus and Pliny the Elder. It is speculated that Cleitarchus drew much information from his father's historical work when writing his own history of Alexander the Great.

== Editions ==
- Lenfant, Dominique (ed., trans. comm.), Les histoires perses de Dinon et d'Héraclide (Paris: De Boccard, 2009) (Persika, 13).
- Plutarch. Parallel Lives. Artaxerxes, Themistocles, 27.
- "DINON".
