= Artabanus of Persia =

5th-century BC Persian political figure

Artabanus Ἀρτάβανος

King of Kings of the Achaemenid Empire (disputed) (Note: Or likely regent for Artaxerxes I)
- Reign: 465 BC (7 months)
- Predecessor: Xerxes I
- Successor: Artaxerxes I

Pharaoh of Egypt (disputed) (Note: Or likely regent for Artaxerxes I)
- Reign: 465 BC (7 months)
- Predecessor: Xerxes I
- Successor: Artaxerxes I
- Born: c. 5th century BC; Hyrcania
- Died: march 465 BC (Note: If we consider that he took the throne directly after Xerxes I's death and that he ruled 7 months from there, this would be the month where he died); Uncertain, Achaemenid Empire
- Dynasty: Achaemenid
- Religion: Ancient Iranian religion

Artabanus of Persia (or Artabanus the Hyrcanian; Ancient Greek: Ἀρτάβανος) was a Persian political figure during the Achaemenid dynasty who was reportedly the power behind the throne for a few months around 465 BC. Ancient writers sometimes included him as the sixth Persian ruler, but this is almost certainly a mistake.

== Biography ==
Artabanus probably originated from the province of Hyrcania and reportedly served as the chief official of Xerxes I. He is considered to have served either as his vizier or as his head bodyguard.

According to Aristotle, Artabanus was responsible for the death of Crown Prince Darius. He then became afraid that Xerxes would seek revenge and proceeded to assassinate the King. On the other hand, Junianus Justinus reported that Artabanus had personal ambitions for the throne. He first secretly murdered Xerxes and then accused Darius of parricide, resulting in his execution. The order of events remains uncertain but the deaths of Xerxes and Darius did leave the throne vacant.

Artabanus' course of action is also uncertain. Some accounts have him usurping the throne for himself. Others consider him to have named young Artaxerxes I as King and to have acted as Regent and power behind the throne. This state of affairs would not last more than a few months. Artaxerxes reportedly slew him with his own sword, either in battle or by surprise. Artabanus is occasionally listed among the Kings of the Achaemenid dynasty though he was not related to them.

== Classical sources ==
- Aristotle, Politics 5.131Ib
- Diodorus Siculus, Historical Library 11.69
- Justin, Epitome of Philipic Histories of Pompeius Trogus III 1
- Photius, Epitome of Persica of Ctesias 20
- Plutarch, Life of Themistocles 27

== See also ==
- Artapanus (general)
