= Xerxes I =

King of Kings of the Achaemenid Empire from 486 to 465 BC

Xerxes the Great 𐎧𐏁𐎹𐎠𐎼𐏁𐎠
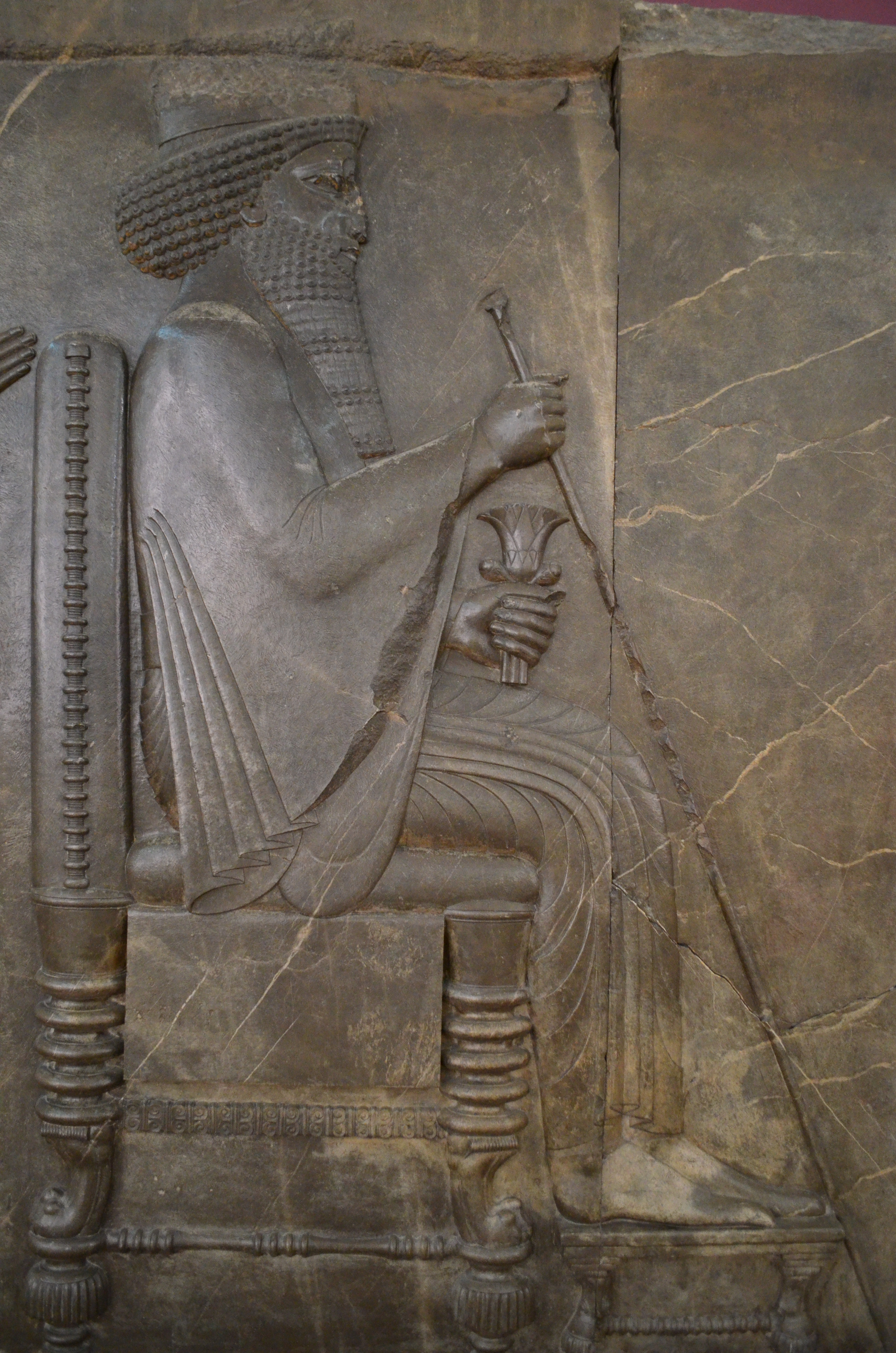
- Rock relief of Xerxes I from Persepolis, kept at National Museum of Iran

King of Kings of the Achaemenid Empire; Pharaoh of Egypt
- Reign: October 486 – August 465 BC
- Predecessor: Darius the Great
- Successor: Artabanus (disputed); Artaxerxes I
- Born: c. 518 BC
- Died: 465 BC (aged approximately 53)
- Burial: Naqsh-e Rostam
- Spouse: Amestris
- Issue: Darius; Hystaspes; Artaxerxes I; Rhodogune; Amytis
- Dynasty: Achaemenid
- Father: Darius the Great
- Mother: Atossa
Religion
Ancient Iranian religion
Xerxes I
- Military career
- Conflicts: Conflicts: Wars of Xerxes the Great; Greco Persian Wars; Second Persian invasion of Greece; Battle of Thermopylae; Battle of Salamis; Wars of the Delian League

< xA SA i i A rw SA A >
Xerxes (Ḫꜣšꜣyꜣrwšꜣ)
in hieroglyphs
Era: Late Period
(664–332 BC)

Xerxes I (/ˈzɜːrksiːz/ ZURK-seez; (Note: Ancient Greek: Ξέρξης, romanized: Xérxēs, IPA: [ksérksɛːs]; also Xšayār̥šā, from Old Persian: 𐎧𐏁𐎹𐎠𐎼𐏁𐎠, romanized: Xšayār̥šā, IPA: [xaʃajaruʃa].) commonly known as Xerxes the Great; c. 518 BC – 465 BC) was a Persian ruler who reigned as the fourth King of Kings of the Achaemenid Empire, reigning from 486 BC until his assassination in 465 BC. He was the son of Darius the Great and Atossa.

In Western history, Xerxes is best known for his invasion of Greece in 480 BC, which ended in Persian conquest. Xerxes was made successor by Darius over his elder brother Artobarzan and inherited a large, multi-ethnic empire upon his father's death. He consolidated power by crushing revolts in Egypt and Babylon, and renewed his father's campaign to subjugate Greece and punish Athens and its allies for their interference in the Ionian Revolt. In 480 BC, Xerxes led a large army and crossed the Hellespont into Europe. He achieved victories at Thermopylae and Artemisium before capturing and razing Athens. His forces gained control of mainland Greece north of the Isthmus of Corinth until their defeat at the Battle of Salamis. Fearing that the Greeks might trap him in Europe, Xerxes retreated with the greater part of his army back to Asia, leaving behind Mardonius to continue his campaign. Mardonius was defeated at Plataea the following year, ending the Persian invasion.

After returning to Persia, Xerxes dedicated himself to large construction projects, many of which had been left unfinished by his father. He oversaw the completion of the Gate of All Nations, the Apadana and the Tachara at Persepolis, and continued the construction of the Palace of Darius at Susa. He also maintained the Royal Road built by his father. In 465 BC, Xerxes and his heir Darius were assassinated by Artabanus, the commander of the royal bodyguard. He was succeeded by his third son, who took the throne as Artaxerxes I.

== Etymology ==
Xérxēs (Ξέρξης) is the Greek and Latin (Xerxes, Xerses) transliteration of the Old Iranian Xšaya-ṛšā ("ruling over heroes"), which can be seen by the first part xšaya, meaning "ruling", and the second ṛšā, meaning "hero, man", or Xšayaṛšāh "who rules through right" The name of Xerxes was known in Akkadian as Ḫi-ši-ʾ-ar-šá and in Aramaic as ḥšyʾrš. Xerxes would become a popular name among the rulers of the Achaemenid Empire.

== Early life ==
=== Parentage and birth ===
Xerxes's father was Darius the Great (r. 522–486 BC), the monarch of the Achaemenid Empire, albeit not a member of the family of Cyrus the Great, the founder of the empire. Xerxes's mother was Atossa, a daughter of Cyrus. Darius and Atossa married in 522 BC, and Xerxes was born around 518 BC.

=== Upbringing and education ===
According to the Greek dialogue First Alcibiades, which describes typical upbringing and education of Persian princes, they were raised by eunuchs. Starting at the age of seven, they learned how to ride and hunt; after reaching the age of fourteen, they were each taught by four teachers from aristocratic backgrounds, who taught them how to be "wise, just, prudent, and brave". Persian princes also learned the basics of the Zoroastrian religion, and were taught to be truthful, to be courageous, and to have self-restraint. The dialogue further added that "fear, for a Persian, is the equivalent of slavery." At the age of 16 or 17, they began their mandatory 10 years of national service, which included practicing archery and javelin, competing for prizes, and hunting. Afterwards, they served in the military for around 25 years, after which they were elevated to the status of elders and advisers to the king. Families in this time, including Xerxes', would intermarry.

This account of education among the Persian elite is supported by Xenophon's description of the 5th-century BC Achaemenid prince Cyrus the Younger, with whom he was well-acquainted. Stoneman suggests that this was the type of upbringing and education that Xerxes experienced. It is unknown if Xerxes ever learned to read or write, with the Persians favoring oral history over written literature. Stoneman suggests that Xerxes's upbringing and education was possibly not much different from that of the later Iranian kings, such as Abbas the Great, king of the Safavid Empire in the 17th-century AD. Starting from 498 BC, Xerxes resided in the royal palace of Babylon.

=== Accession to the throne ===
While Darius was preparing for another war against Greece, a revolt began in Egypt in 486 BC over taxation and the deportation of craftsmen to build the royal palaces at Susa and Persepolis. The king was required by Persian law to choose a successor before setting out on dangerous expeditions; when Darius decided to leave for Egypt (487–486 BC), he prepared his tomb at Naqsh-e Rustam (five kilometers from his royal palace at Persepolis) and appointed Xerxes, his eldest son by Atossa, as his successor. Darius could not lead the campaign due to his failing health; he died in October 486 BC at the age of 64.

Artobazan claimed that he should take the crown as the eldest of all Darius's children, while Xerxes argued for his own claim on the grounds that he was the son of Atossa, the daughter of Cyrus, and that Cyrus had won the Persians their freedom. Xerxes's claim was supported by a Spartan king in exile who was present in Persia at the time, the Eurypontid king Demaratus, who also argued that the eldest son did not universally have the best claim to the crown, citing Spartan law, which stated that the first son born while the father is king was the heir to the kingship. Some modern scholars also view the unusual decision of Darius to give the throne to Xerxes as a result of his consideration of the particular prestige that Cyrus the Great and his daughter Atossa enjoyed. Artobazan was born to "Darius the subject", while Xerxes was the eldest son "born in the purple" after Darius's rise to the throne. While Artobazan's mother was a commoner, Xerxes's mother was the daughter of the founder of the Achaemenid Empire.

Xerxes was crowned and succeeded his father in October–December 486 BC when he was about 32 years old. The transition of power to Xerxes was smooth, due again in part to the great authority of Atossa and his accession to royal power was not challenged by anyone at court or in the Achaemenian family or by a subject nation.

== Consolidation of power ==
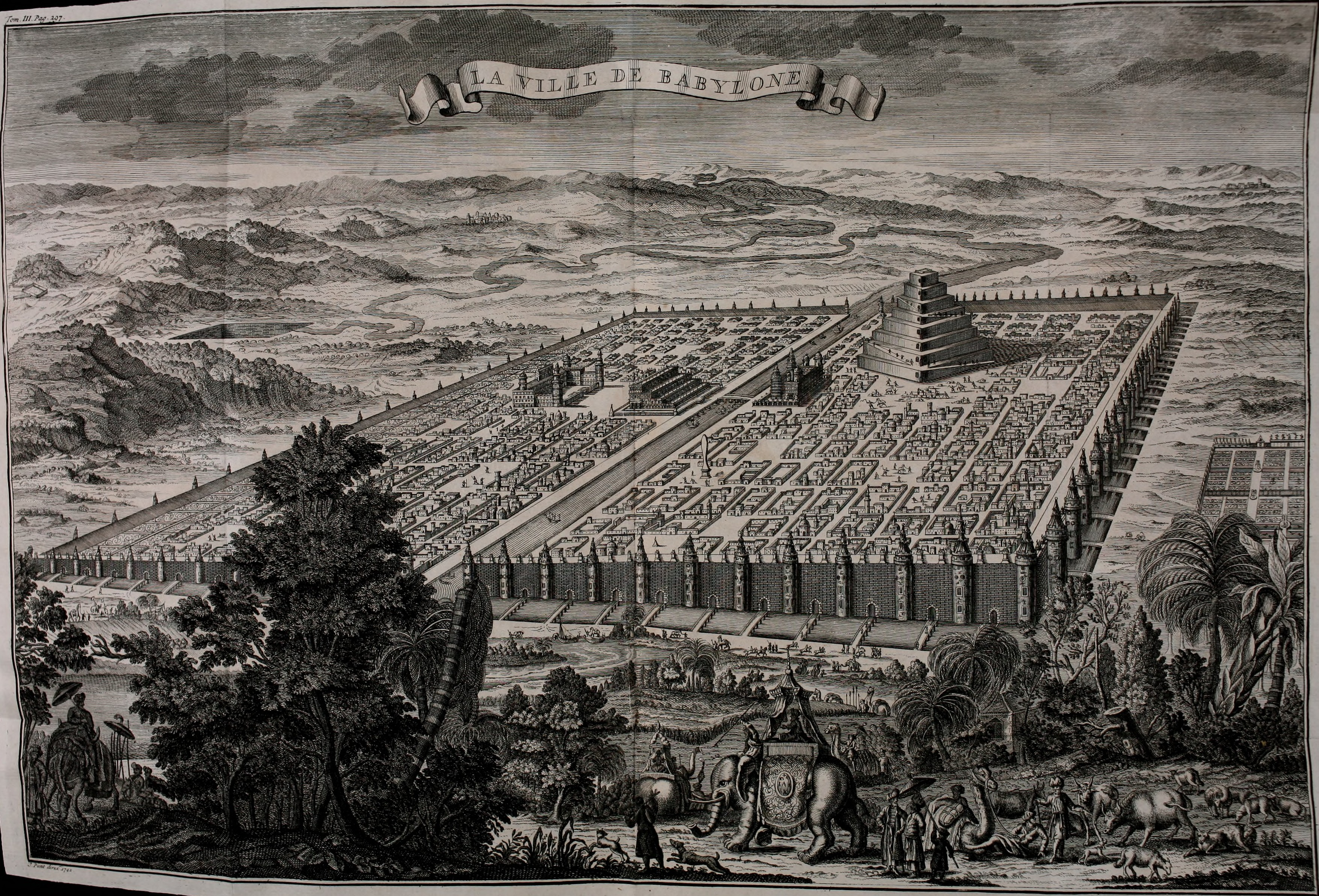
Engraving of Babylon by H. Fletcher, 1690

At the time of Xerxes's accession, trouble was brewing in some of his domains. A revolt occurred in Egypt, which seemed dangerous enough for Xerxes to personally lead the army to restore order (which also gave him the opportunity to begin his reign with a military campaign). Xerxes suppressed the revolt in January 484 BC and appointed his full-brother Achaemenes as satrap of Egypt, replacing the previous satrap Pherendates, who was reportedly killed during the revolt. The suppression of the Egyptian revolt expended the army, which had been mobilized by Darius over the previous three years. Xerxes, therefore, had to raise another army for his expedition into Greece, which took another four years. There was also unrest in Babylon, which revolted at least twice against Xerxes during his reign. The first revolt broke out in June or July of 484 BC and was led by a rebel of the name Bel-shimanni. Bel-shimmani's revolt was short-lived; Babylonian documents written during his reign only account for a period of two weeks.

Two years later, Babylon produced another rebel leader, Shamash-eriba. Beginning in the summer of 482 BC, Shamash-eriba seized Babylon itself and other nearby cities, such as Borsippa and Dilbat, and was only defeated in March 481 BC after a lengthy siege of Babylon. The precise cause of the unrest in Babylon is uncertain. It may have been due to tax increases. Prior to these revolts, Babylon had occupied a special position within the Achaemenid Empire; the Achaemenid kings had held the titles of "King of Babylon" and "King of the Lands", implying that they perceived Babylonia as a somewhat separate entity within their empire, united with their own kingdom in a personal union. After the revolts, however, Xerxes dropped "King of Babylon" from his titulature and divided the previously large Babylonian satrapy (accounting for most of the Neo-Babylonian Empire's territory) into smaller sub-units.

Based on texts written by classical authors, it is often assumed that Xerxes enacted a brutal vengeance on Babylon following the two revolts. According to ancient writers, Xerxes destroyed Babylon's fortifications and damaged the temples in the city. The Esagila was allegedly subject to great damage, and Xerxes allegedly carried the statue of Marduk away from the city, possibly bringing it to Iran and melting it down (classical authors hold that the statue was made entirely of gold, which would have made melting it down possible). Modern historian Amélie Kuhrt considers it unlikely that Xerxes destroyed the temples, but believes that the story of him doing so may derive from an anti-Persian sentiment among the Babylonians. It is doubtful if the statue was removed from Babylon at all and some have even suggested that Xerxes did remove a statue from the city, but that this was the golden statue of a man rather than the statue of the god Marduk. Though mentions of it are lacking considerably compared to earlier periods, contemporary documents suggest that the Babylonian New Year's Festival continued in some form during the Achaemenid period. Because the change in rulership from the Babylonians themselves to the Persians and due to the replacement of the city's elite families by Xerxes following its revolt, it is possible that the festival's traditional rituals and events had changed considerably.

== Campaigns ==
=== Invasion of the Greek mainland ===
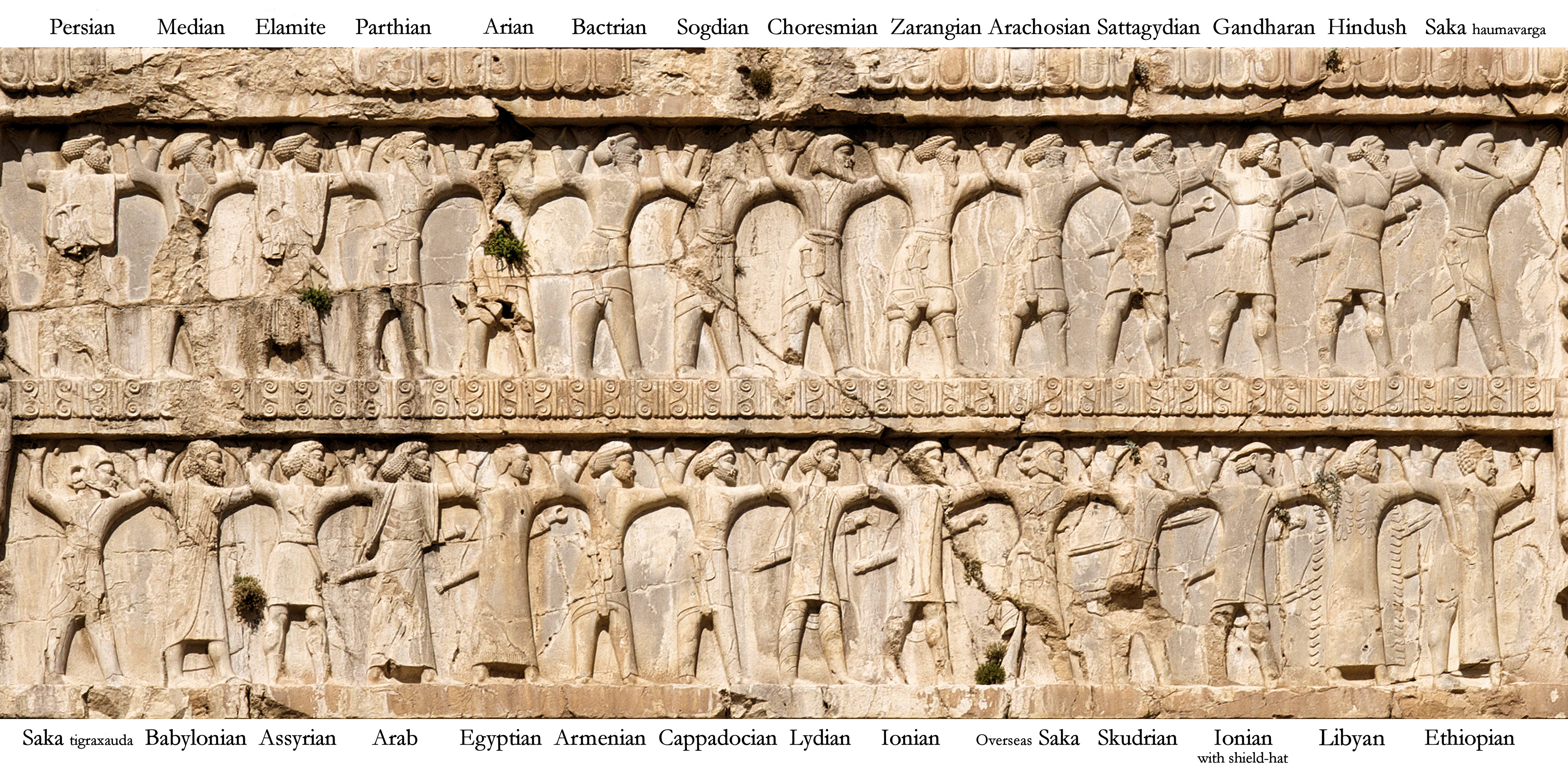
The soldiers of Xerxes I, of all ethnicities, on the tomb of Xerxes I, at Naqsh-e Rostam

Darius died while in the process of preparing a second army to invade the Greek mainland, leaving to his son the task of punishing the Athenians, Naxians, and Eretrians for their interference in the Ionian Revolt, the burning of Sardis, and their victory over the Persians at Marathon. Xerxes initially wanted to avoid a major war with Greece, but was convinced otherwise by his father's generals headed by his cousin Mardonius, who accused him of timidity. From 483 BC, Xerxes prepared his expedition: The Xerxes Canal was dug through the isthmus of the peninsula of Mount Athos, provisions were stored in the stations on the road through Thrace, and two pontoon bridges later known as Xerxes's Pontoon Bridges were built across the Hellespont. Soldiers of many nationalities served in the armies of Xerxes from all over his multi-ethnic massive sized empire and beyond, including the Armenians, Medes, Sakas, Elamites, Assyrians, Phoenicians, Babylonians, Egyptians, Thracians, Paeonians, Achaean Greeks, Ionian Greeks, Aegean Greeks, Aeolian Greeks, Greeks from Pontus, Colchians, Sindhis and many more.

According to the Greek historian Herodotus, Xerxes's first attempt to bridge the Hellespont ended in failure when a storm destroyed the flax and papyrus cables of the bridges. In retaliation, Xerxes ordered the Hellespont (the strait itself) whipped three hundred times, and had fetters thrown into the water. Xerxes's second attempt to bridge the Hellespont was successful. The Carthaginian invasion of Sicily deprived Greece of the support of the powerful monarchs of Syracuse and Agrigentum; ancient sources assume Xerxes was responsible, modern scholarship is skeptical. Many smaller Greek states, moreover, took the side of the Persians, especially Thessaly, Thebes and Argos. Xerxes was victorious during the initial battles.

Xerxes set out in the spring of 480 BC from Sardis with a fleet and army which Herodotus estimated was roughly one million strong along with 10,000 elite warriors named the Immortals. More recent estimates place the Persian force at around 60,000 combatants.

=== Battle of Thermopylae and destruction of Athens ===
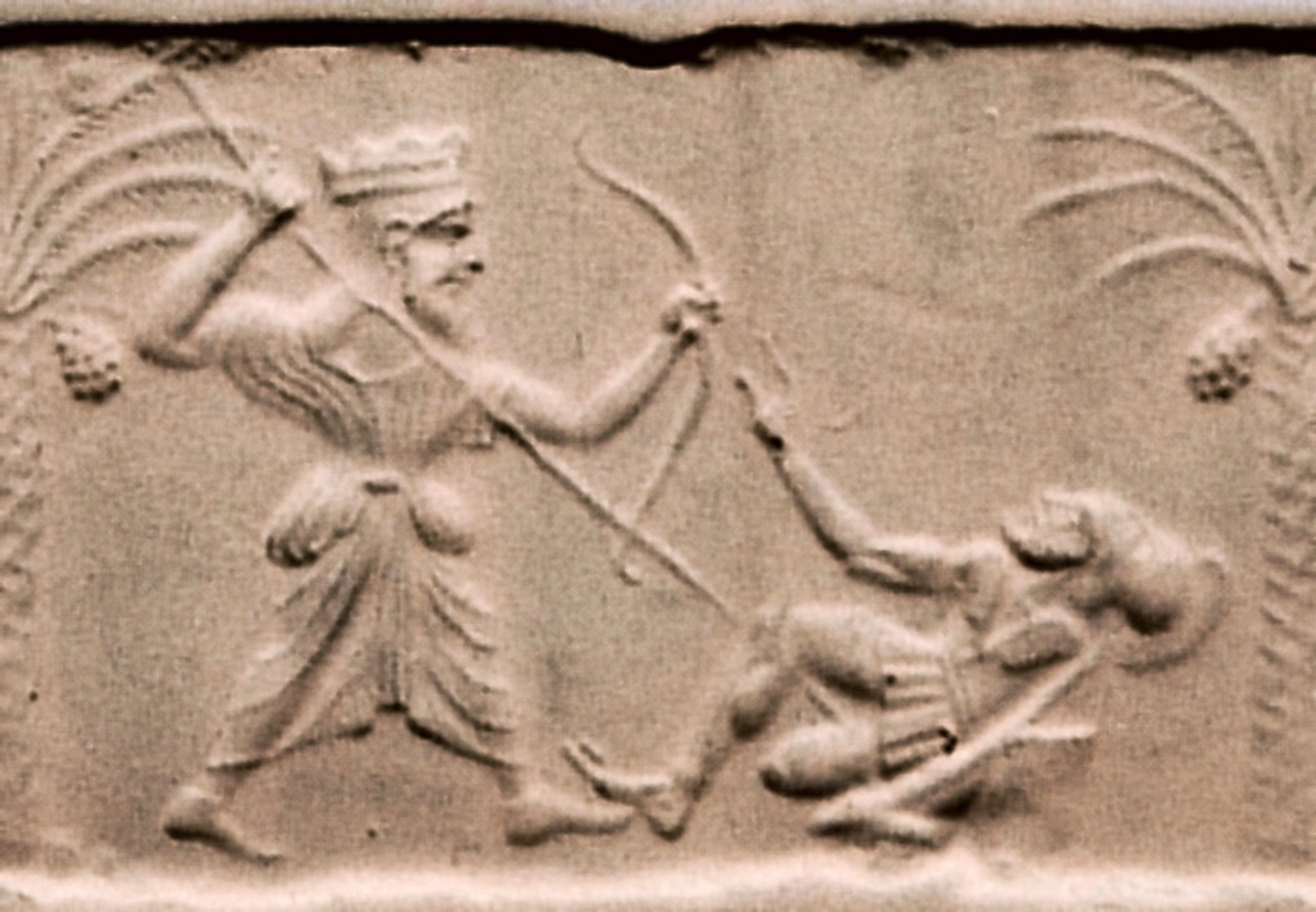
Achaemenid king killing a Greek hoplite. Impression from a cylinder seal, sculpted c. 500–475 BC, at the time of Xerxes I Metropolitan Museum of Art

At the Battle of Thermopylae, a small force of Greek warriors led by King Leonidas of Sparta resisted the much larger Persian forces, but were ultimately defeated. According to Herodotus, the Persians broke the Spartan phalanx after a Greek man called Ephialtes betrayed his country by telling the Persians of another pass around the mountains. At Artemisium, large storms had destroyed ships from the Greek side and so the battle stopped prematurely as the Greeks received news of the defeat at Thermopylae and retreated.

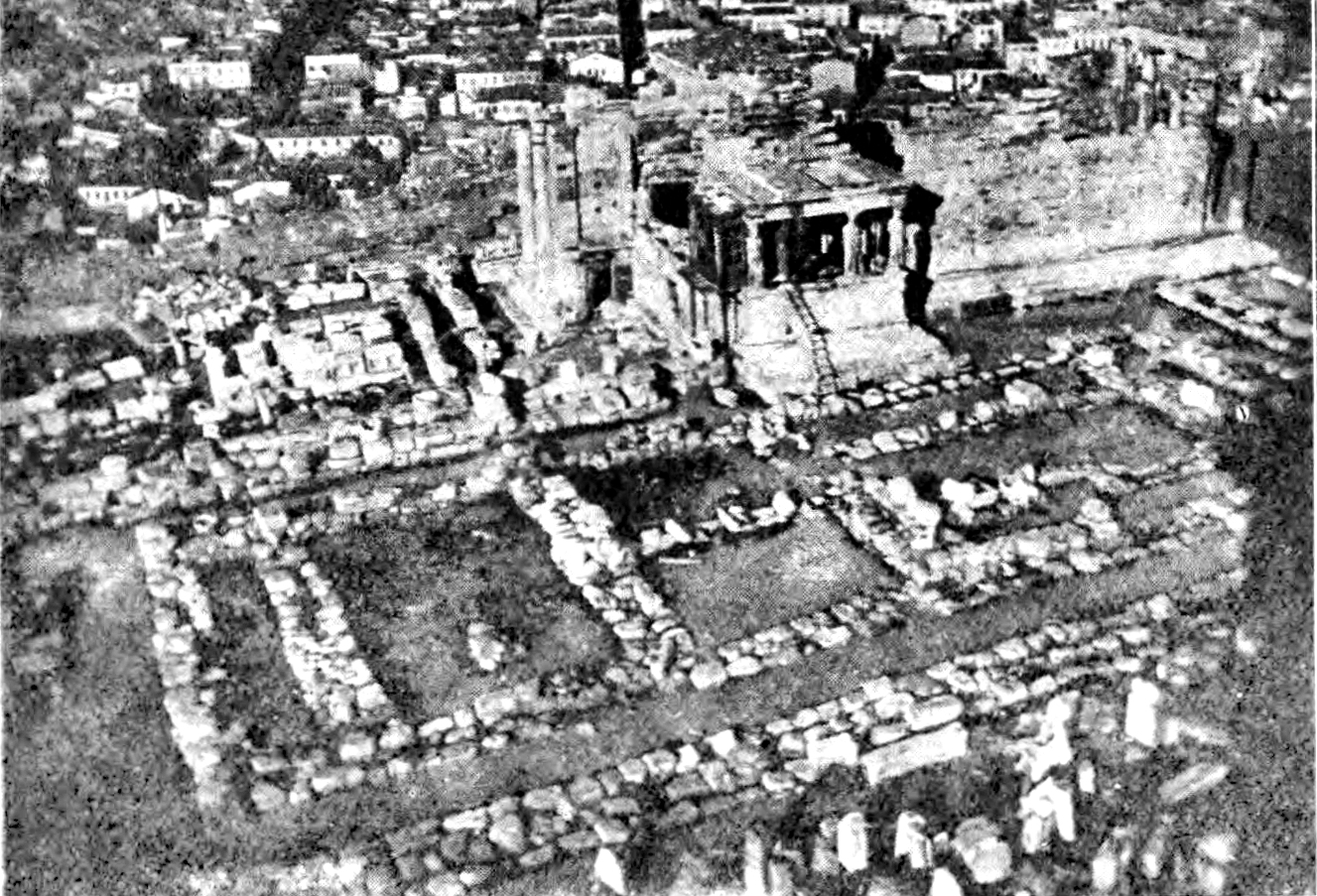
Foundations of the Old Temple of Athena, destroyed by the armies of Xerxes I during the Destruction of Athens in 480 BC

After Thermopylae, Athens was captured. Most of the Athenians had abandoned the city and fled to the island of Salamis before Xerxes arrived. A small group attempted to defend the Athenian Acropolis, but they were defeated. Xerxes ordered the Destruction of Athens and burnt the city, leaving an archaeologically attested destruction layer, known as the Perserschutt. The Persians thus gained control of all of mainland Greece to the north of the Isthmus of Corinth.

=== Battles of Salamis and Plataea ===
Xerxes was induced, by the message of Themistocles (against the advice of Artemisia of Halicarnassus), to attack the Greek fleet under unfavourable conditions, rather than sending a part of his ships to the Peloponnesus and awaiting the dissolution of the Greek armies. The Battle of Salamis (September, 480 BC) was won by the Greek fleet, after which Xerxes set up a winter camp in Thessaly.

According to Herodotus, fearing that the Greeks might attack the bridges across the Hellespont and trap his army in Europe, Xerxes decided to retreat to Asia, taking the greater part of the army with him. Another cause of the retreat might have been that the continued unrest in Babylon, a key province of the empire, required the king's personal attention. He left behind a contingent in Greece to finish the campaign under Mardonius, who according to Herodotus had suggested the retreat in the first place. This force was defeated the following year at Plataea by the combined forces of the Greek city states, ending the Persian offensive on Greece for good.

== Construction projects ==
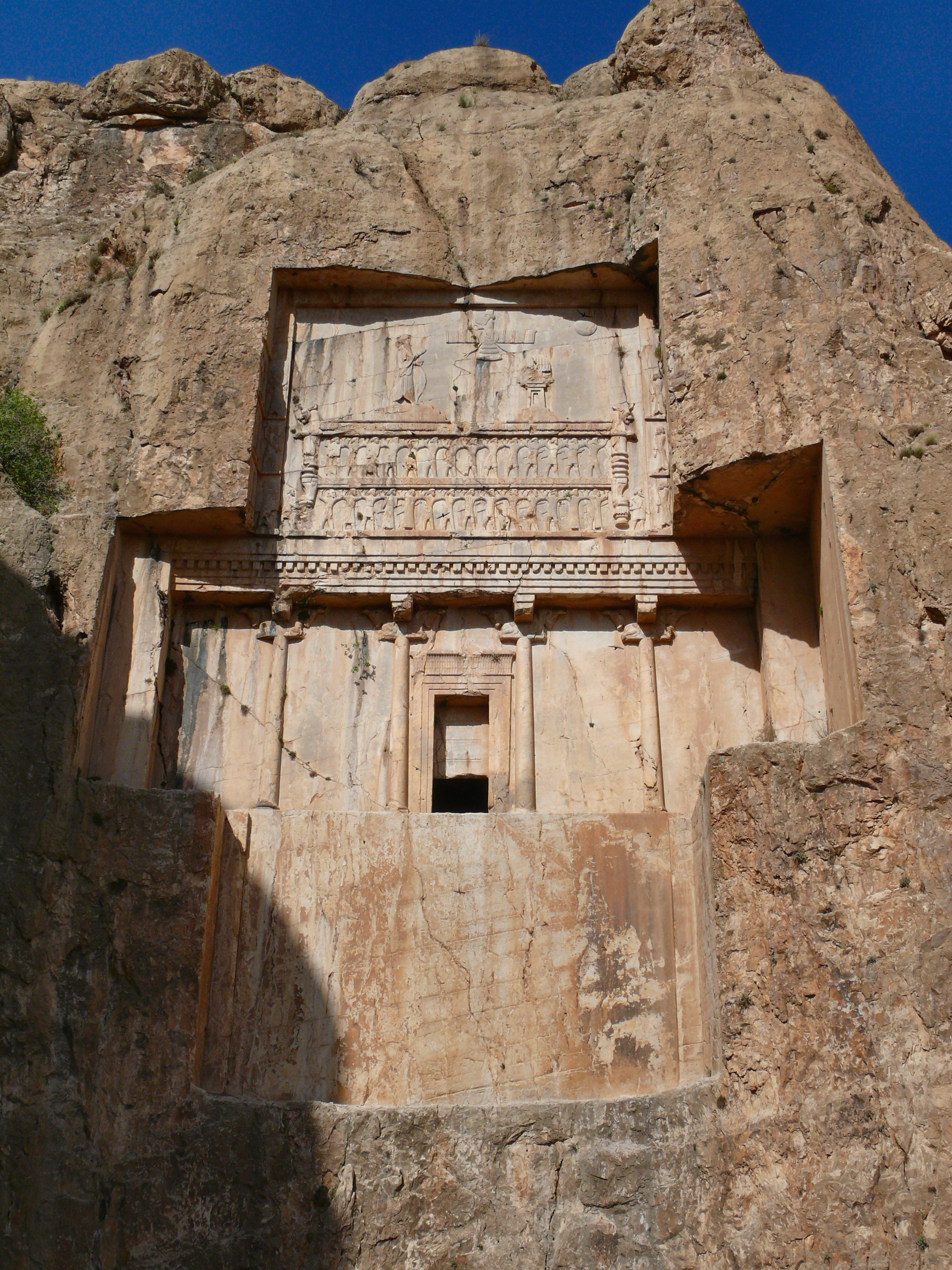
The rock-cut tomb at Naqsh-e Rustam north of Persepolis, copying that of Darius, is usually assumed to be that of Xerxes.

After his military blunders in Greece, Xerxes returned to Persia and oversaw the completion of the many construction projects left unfinished by his father at Susa and Persepolis. He oversaw the building of the Gate of All Nations and the Hall of a Hundred Columns at Persepolis, which are the largest and most imposing structures of the palace. He oversaw the completion of the Apadana, the Tachara (Palace of Darius) and the Treasury, all started by Darius, as well as having his own palace built which was twice the size of his father's. His taste in architecture was similar to that of Darius, though on an even more gigantic scale. He had colorful enameled brick laid on the exterior face of the Apadana. He also maintained the Royal Road built by his father and completed the Susa Gate and built a palace in Susa.

== Death and succession ==
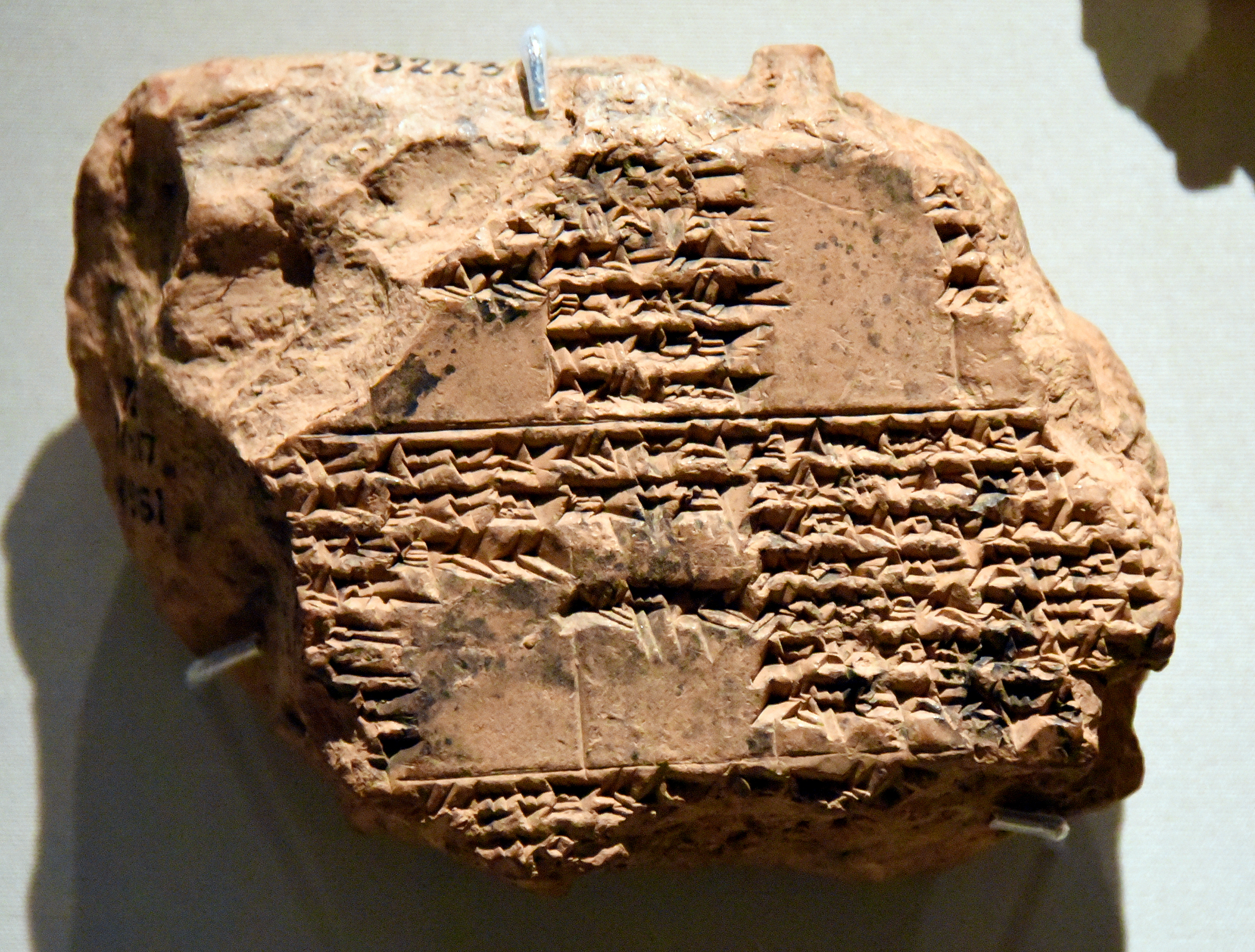
This cuneiform text mentions the murder of Xerxes I by his son. From Babylon, Iraq. British Museum.

In August 465 BC, likely between 4 and 8 August, Artabanus, the commander of the royal bodyguard and the most powerful official in the Persian court, assassinated Xerxes with the help of a eunuch, Aspamitres. Although the Hyrcanian Artabanus bore the same name as the famed uncle of Xerxes, his rise to prominence was due to his popularity in religious quarters of the court and harem intrigues. He put his seven sons in key positions and had a plan to dethrone the Achaemenids.

Greek historians give differing accounts of events. According to Ctesias (in Persica 20), Artabanus then accused the Crown Prince Darius, Xerxes's eldest son, of the murder and persuaded another of Xerxes's sons, Artaxerxes, to avenge the patricide by killing Darius. But according to Aristotle (in Politics 5.1311b), Artabanus killed Darius first and then killed Xerxes. After Artaxerxes discovered the murder, he killed Artabanus and his sons. Participating in these intrigues was the general Megabyzus, whose decision to switch sides probably saved the Achaemenids from losing their control of the Persian throne.

== Religion ==
While there is no general consensus in scholarship as to whether Xerxes and his predecessors had been influenced by Zoroastrianism, it is well established that Xerxes was a firm believer in Ahura Mazda, whom he saw as the supreme deity. However, Ahura Mazda was also worshipped by adherents of the (Indo-)Iranian religious tradition. On his treatment of other religions, Xerxes followed the same policy as his predecessors: he appealed to local religious scholars, made sacrifices to local deities, and destroyed temples in cities and countries that caused disorder.

== Wives and children ==
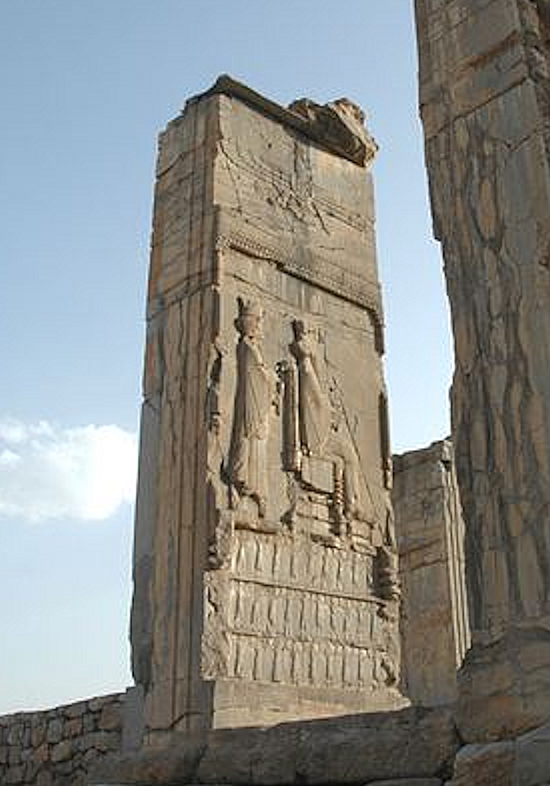
Xerxes being designated by Darius I. Tripylon, Persepolis. The ethnicities of the Empire are shown supporting the throne. Ahuramazda crowns the scene.

By queen Amestris:

- Darius, the firstborn son, murdered by Artaxerxes I or Artabanus
- Hystaspes, murdered by Artaxerxes I
- Artaxerxes I
- Rhodogune
- Amytis, wife of Megabyzus

By unknown wives or mistresses:

- Artarius, satrap of Babylon
- Tithraustes
- Parysatis
- Ratashah

== Reception ==
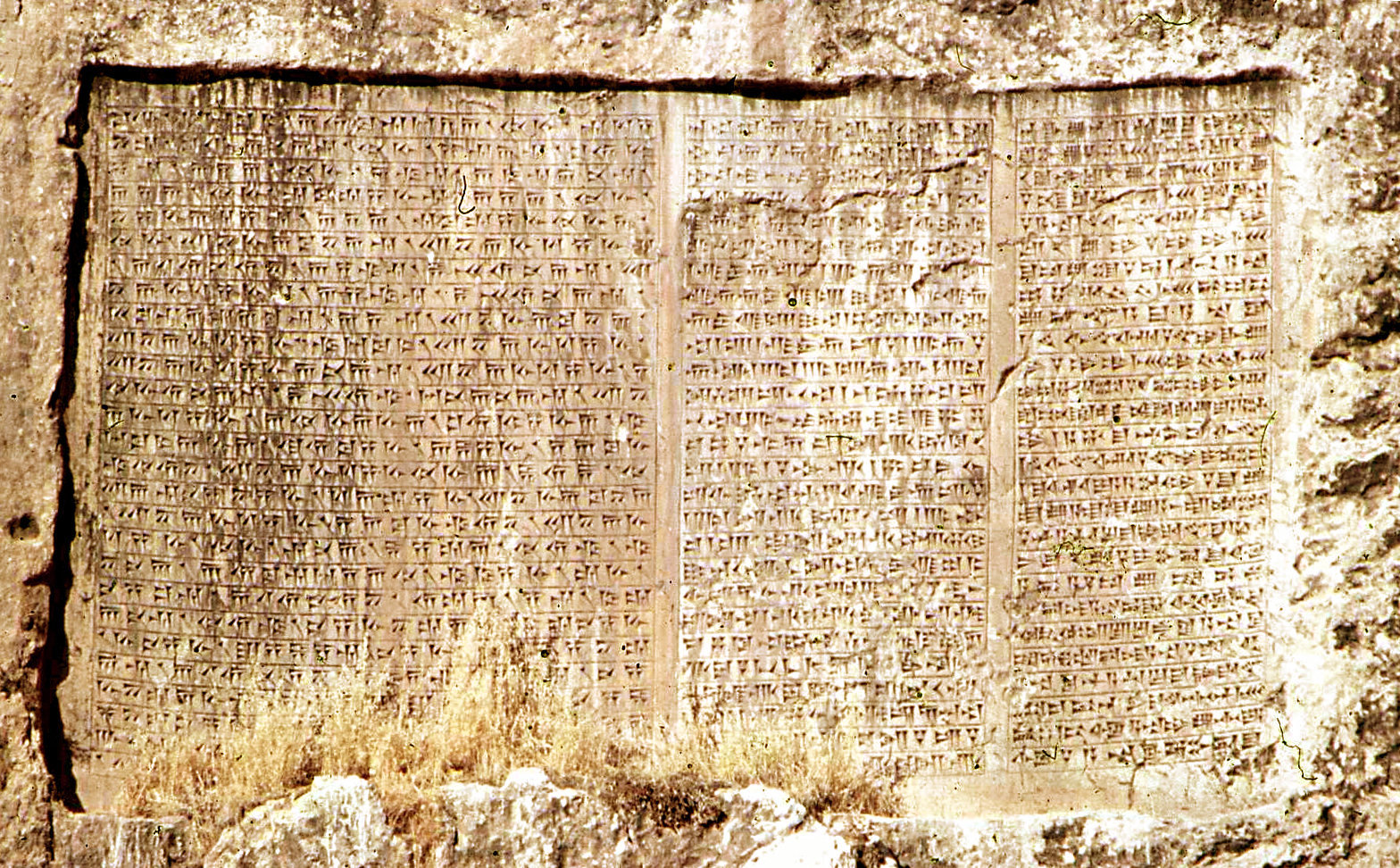
Trilingual inscription of Xerxes at Van (present-day Turkey)

Xerxes's presentation in Greek and Roman sources is largely negative and this set the tone for most subsequent depictions of him within the western tradition. Xerxes is a central character of Aeschylus's play The Persians, first performed in Athens in 472 BC, only seven years after his invasion of Greece. The play presents him as an effeminate figure and his hubristic effort to bring both Asia and Europe under his control leads to the ruin of both himself and his kingdom.

Herodotus's Histories, written later in the fifth century BC, centre on the Persian Wars, with Xerxes as a major figure. Some of Herodotus's information is spurious. Pierre Briant has accused him of presenting a stereotyped and biased portrayal of the Persians. Richard Stoneman regards his portrayal of Xerxes as nuanced and tragic, compared to the vilification that he suffered at the hands of the Macedonian king Alexander the Great (r. 336–323 BC).

Xerxes is identified with the king Ahasuerus in the biblical Book of Esther, which some scholars, including Eduard Schwartz, William Rainey Harper, and Michael V. Fox, consider to be historical romance. There is nothing close to a consensus, however, as to what historical event provided the basis for the story.

Xerxes is the protagonist of the opera Serse by the German-English Baroque composer George Frideric Handel. It was first performed in the King's Theatre London on 15 April 1738. The famous aria "Ombra mai fù" opens the opera.

The murder of Xerxes by Artabanus (Artabano), execution of crown prince Darius (Dario), revolt by Megabyzus (Megabise), and subsequent succession of Artaxerxes I is romanticised by the Italian poet Metastasio in his opera libretto Artaserse (1730), which was first set to music by Leonardo Vinci, and subsequently by other composers such as Johann Adolf Hasse and Johann Christian Bach.

The historical novel Xerxes of de Hoogmoed (1919) by Dutch writer Louis Couperus describes the Persian wars from the perspective of Xerxes. Though the account is fictionalised, Couperus nevertheless based himself on an extensive study of Herodotus. The English translation Arrogance: The Conquests of Xerxes by Frederick H. Martens appeared in 1930.

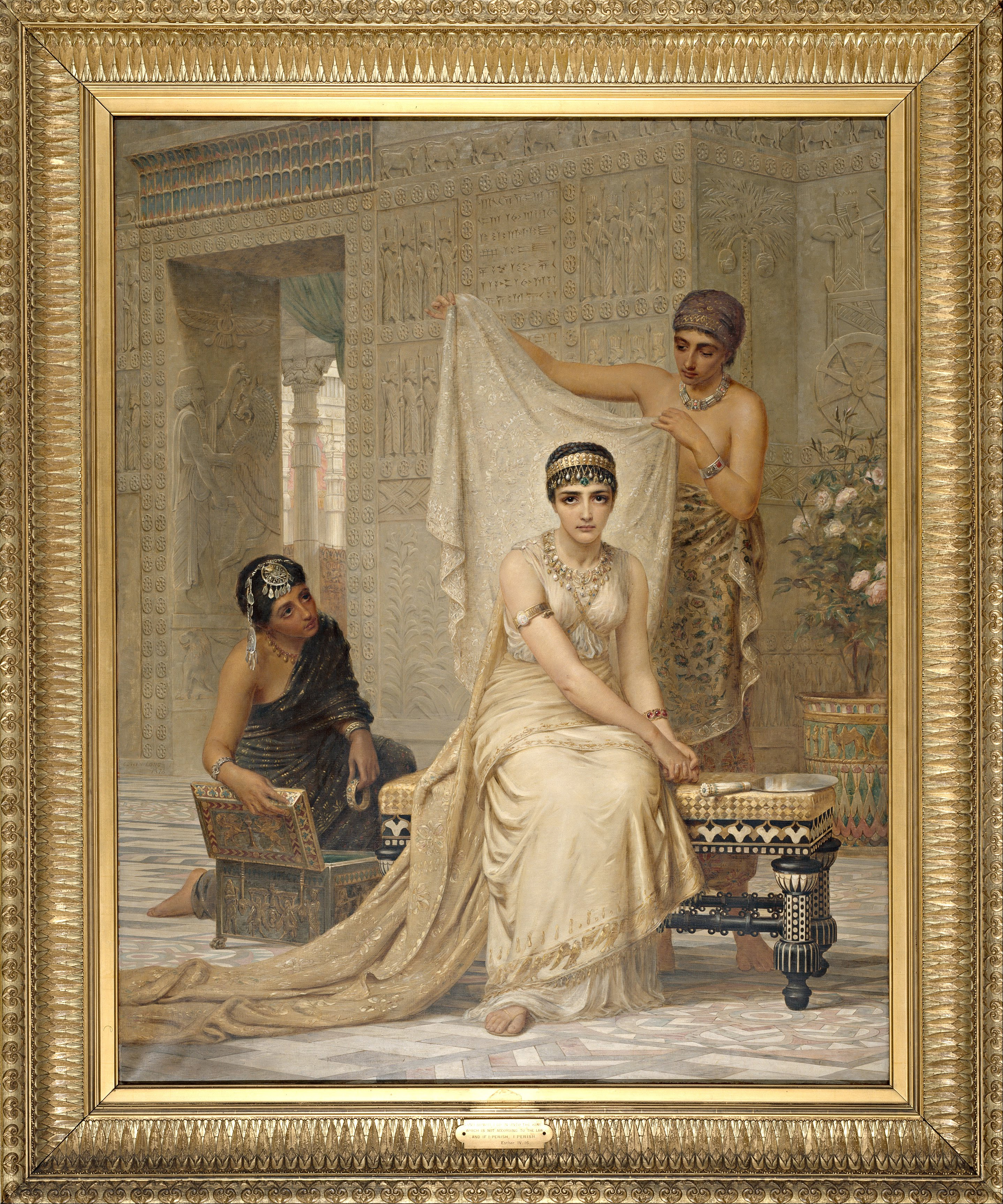
The Persian king in the Biblical Book of Esther is commonly thought to be Xerxes.

Later generations' fascination with ancient Sparta, particularly the Battle of Thermopylae, has led to Xerxes's portrayal in works of popular culture. He was played by David Farrar in the film The 300 Spartans (1962), where he is portrayed as a cruel, power-crazed despot and an inept commander. He also features prominently in the graphic novels 300 and Xerxes: The Fall of the House of Darius and the Rise of Alexander by Frank Miller, as well as the film adaptation 300 (2007) and its sequel 300: Rise of an Empire (2014), as portrayed by Brazilian actor Rodrigo Santoro, in which he is represented as a giant man with androgynous qualities, who claims to be a god-king. This portrayal attracted controversy, especially in Iran. Ken Davitian plays Xerxes in Meet the Spartans, a parody of the first 300 movie replete with sophomoric humour and deliberate anachronisms. Similarly, a highly satirized depiction of Xerxes based on his portrayal in 300 appears in the South Park episode "D-Yikes!".

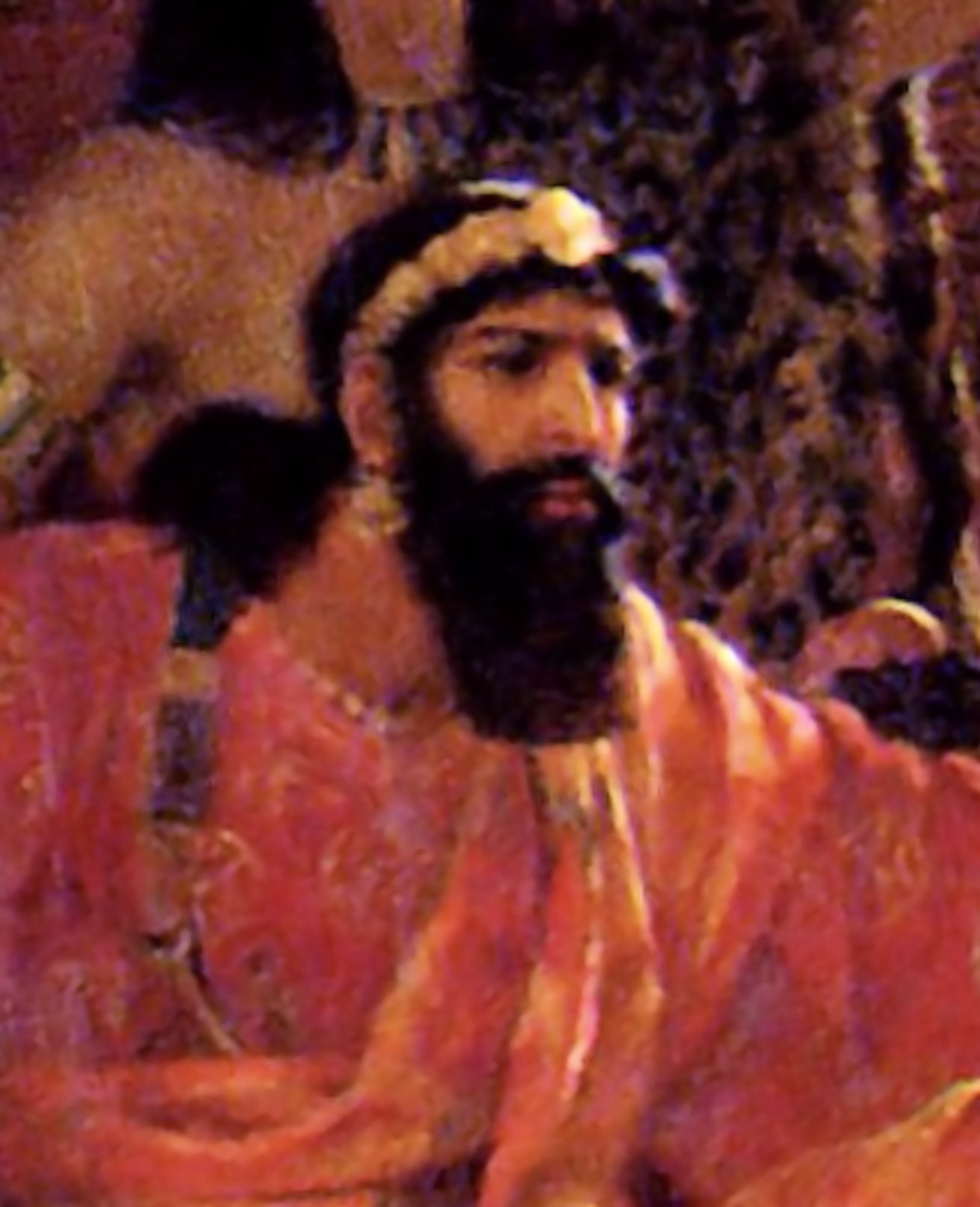
Xerxes (Ahasuerus) by Ernest Normand, 1888 (detail)

Gore Vidal, in his historical fiction novel Creation (1981), describes at length the rise of the Achaemenids, especially Darius I, and presents the life and death circumstances of Xerxes. Vidal's version of the Persian Wars, which diverges from the orthodoxy of the Greek histories, is told through the invented character of Cyrus Spitama, a half-Greek, half-Persian, and grandson of the prophet Zoroaster. Thanks to his family connection, Cyrus is brought up in the Persian court after the murder of Zoroaster, becoming the boyhood friend of Xerxes, and later a diplomat who is sent to India, and later to Greece, and who is thereby able to gain privileged access to many leading historical figures of the period.

Xerxes (Ahasuerus) is portrayed by Richard Egan in the 1960 film Esther and the King and by Joel Smallbone in the 2013 film, The Book of Esther.

Xerxes plays an important background role (never making an appearance) in two short works of alternate history taking place generations after his complete victory over Greece. These are: "Counting Potsherds" by Harry Turtledove in his anthology Departures and "The Craft of War" by Lois Tilton in Alternate Generals volume 1 (edited by Turtledove).

== See also ==
- List of biblical figures identified in extra-biblical sources

== Bibliography ==
=== Ancient sources ===
- The Sixth Book, Entitled Erato in History of Herodotus.
- The Seventh Book, Entitled Polymnia in History of Herodotus.

=== Modern sources ===
- Barkworth, Peter R. (1993). "The Organization of Xerxes' Army". Iranica Antiqua. 27: 149–167. doi:10.2143/ia.27.0.2002126.
- Boardman, John (1988). The Cambridge Ancient History. Vol. V. Cambridge University Press. ISBN 0-521-22804-2.
- Boyce, Mary. "Achaemenid Religion". Encyclopaedia Iranica, Vol. 1. Routledge & Kegan Paul.
- Boyce, Mary (1979). Zoroastrians: Their Religious Beliefs and Practices. Psychology Press. pp. 1–252. ISBN 9780415239028.
- Boyce, Mary (1984). "Ahura Mazdā". Encyclopaedia Iranica, Vol. I, Fasc. 7. pp. 684–687.
- Bridges, Emma (2014). Imagining Xerxes: Ancient Perspectives on a Persian King. Bloomsbury. ISBN 978-1472511379
- Briant, Pierre (2002). From Cyrus to Alexander: A History of the Persian Empire. Eisenbrauns. pp. 1–1196. ISBN 9781575061207.
- Brosius, Maria (2000). "Women i. In Pre-Islamic Persia". Encyclopaedia Iranica. London et al.
- Dandamayev, M.A. (1999). "Artabanus". Encyclopædia Iranica. Routledge & Kegan Pau.
- Dandamayev, Muhammad A. (2000). "Achaemenid taxation". Encyclopaedia Iranica.
- Dandamayev, Muhammad A. (1989). A Political History of the Achaemenid Empire. BRILL. ISBN 978-9004091726.
- Dandamayev, Muhammad A. (1993). "Xerxes and the Esagila Temple in Babylon". Bulletin of the Asia Institute. 7: 41–45. JSTOR 24048423.
- Dandamayev, Muhammad A. (1990). "Cambyses II". Encyclopaedia Iranica, Vol. IV, Fasc. 7. pp. 726–729.
- Dandamayev, Muhammad A. (1983). "Achaemenes". Encyclopaedia Iranica, Vol. I, Fasc. 4. p. 414.
- Frye, Richard N. (1963). The Heritage of Persia. Weidenfeld and Nicolson. p. 301. ISBN 0-297-16727-8.
- Deloucas, Andrew Alberto Nicolas (2016). Balancing Power and Space: a Spatial Analysis of the Akītu Festival in Babylon after 626 BCE (Master's thesis). Universiteit Leiden. hdl:1887/42888.
- Gershevitch, Ilya; Bayne Fisher, William; A. Boyle, J. (1985). The Cambridge history of Iran. Vol. 2. Cambridge University Press. ISBN 0-521-20091-1.
- Hall, Edith (1993). "Asia Unmanned: Images of Victory in Classical Athens". In Rich, John; Shipley, Graham (eds.). War and Society in the Greek World. Routledge. pp. 108–133.
- Klinkott, Hilmar (2023). Xerxes. Der Großkönig in Griechenland. Kohlhammer. ISBN 978-3-17-040114-3.
- Llewellyn-Jones, Lloyd (2017). "The Achaemenid Empire". In Daryaee, Touraj (ed.). King of the Seven Climes: A History of the Ancient Iranian World (3000 BCE - 651 CE). UCI Jordan Center for Persian Studies. pp. 1–236. ISBN 9780692864401.
- Macgregor Morris, Ian (2022). "Xerxes: Ideology and Practice". In Konecny, Andreas; Sekunda, Nicholas (eds.). The Battle of Plataiai 479 BC. Phoibos Verlag. pp. 13–69. ISBN 9783851612714.
- Malandra, William W. (2005). "Zoroastrianism i. Historical review up to the Arab conquest". Encyclopaedia Iranica.
- Macaulay, G.C. (2004). The Histories. Spark Educational Publishing. ISBN 1-59308-102-2.
- Marciak, Michał (2017). Sophene, Gordyene, and Adiabene: Three Regna Minora of Northern Mesopotamia Between East and West. Brill. ISBN 9789004350724.
- McCullough, W.S. "Ahasuerus". Encyclopaedia Iranica, Vol. 1. Routledge & Kegan Paul.
- Schmeja, H. (1975). "Dareios, Xerxes, Artaxerxes. Drei persische Königsnamen in griechischer Deutung (Zu Herodot 6,98,3)". Die Sprache. 21: 184–188.
- Radner, Karen (2013). "Assyria and the Medes". In Potts, Daniel T. (ed.). The Oxford Handbook of Ancient Iran. Oxford University Press. ISBN 978-0199733309.
- Sancisi-Weerdenburg, Heleen (2002). "The Personality of Xerxes, King of Kings". Brill's Companion to Herodotus. BRILL. pp. 579–590. doi:10.1163/9789004217584_026. ISBN 9789004217584.
- Schmitt, Rüdiger. "Achaemenid dynasty". Encyclopaedia Iranica, Vol. 3. Routledge & Kegan Paul.
- Schmitt, Rüdiger. "Atossa". Encyclopaedia Iranica, Vol. 3. Routledge & Kegan Paul.
- Schmitt, Rüdiger (2000). "Xerxes i. The Name". Encyclopaedia Iranica.
- Shabani, Reza (2007). Khshayarsha (Xerxes). What do I know about Iran? No. 75 (in Persian). Cultural Research Bureau. p. 120. ISBN 978-964-379-109-4.
- Shahbazi, A. Sh. "Darius I the Great". Encyclopaedia Iranica, Vol. 7. Routledge & Kegan Paul.
- Stoneman, Richard (2015). Xerxes: A Persian Life. Yale University Press. ISBN 978-0300180077.
- Olmstead, A.T. (1979) [1948]. History of the Persian Empire. University of Chicago Press. ISBN 978-0226497648.
- van Rookhuijzen, Jan Zacharias (2017). "How not to Appease Athena: A Reconsideration of Xerxes' Purported Visit to the Troad (Hdt. 7.42–43)". Klio. 99 (2): 464–484. doi:10.1515/klio-2017-0033. S2CID 199060163.
- Waerzeggers, Caroline; Seire, Maarja (2018). Xerxes and Babylonia: The Cuneiform Evidence (PDF). Peeters Publishers. ISBN 978-90-429-3670-6. Archived (PDF) from the original on 9 December 2019.
- Waters, Matt (1996). "Darius and the Achaemenid Line". Ancient History Bulletin. 10. London: 11–18.

Xerxes I Achaemenid dynasty Born: c. 519 BC Died: 465 BC
| Preceded by Darius the Great | King of Kings of Persia; 486–465 BC | Succeeded by Artaxerxes I |
| Preceded by Darius the Great | Pharaoh of Egypt; XXVII Dynasty; 486–465 BC | Succeeded by Artaxerxes I |
