= Rhodogune =

Rhodogune or Rhodugune may refer to:

- Rhodogune (mother of Darius I), an Achaemenid queen
- Rhodogune (daughter of Xerxes I), an Achaemenid princess
  - Persian Princess, an archaeological forgery regarding the daughter of Xerxes
- Rhodogune (daughter of Artaxerxes II), an Achaemenid princess and wife of Orontes I of Armenia
- Rhodogune of Parthia (fl. 2nd century BC), daughter of Mithradates I and wife of Demetrios II of Syria
