= Der (Sumer) =

Ancient Sumerian city-state

- Tell Aqar
- Location within Iraq
- 33°7′25″N 45°55′53″E
- Type: settlement
- Periods: Early Dynastic thru Neo-Assyrian
- Location: Iraq

Site notes
- Condition: Ruined
- Owner: Public
- Public access: Yes

Der or Dēru (Sumerian: 𒌷𒂦𒀭𒆠 ^{uru}BAD_{3}.AN^{ki}; Akkadian: 𒌷𒂦𒀭𒆠 ^{uru}BAD_{3}.AN^{ki} or 𒌷𒁲𒂊𒊒(𒆠) ^{uru}de-e-ru^{(ki)}) was a Sumerian city-state at the site of modern Tell Aqar near al-Badra in Iraq's Wasit Governorate. It was east of the Tigris River on the border between Sumer and Elam. At one time it was thought that it might have been ancient Durum (Sumerian: ^{uru}BAD_{3}^{ki}) but more recent scholarship has rebutted that.

The principal god of Der was Ištaran. In the 1st millennium BC, he was also referred to as Anu rabû ("Great Anu") in Akkadian. The name of his temple at Der was Edimgalkalama.

== History ==
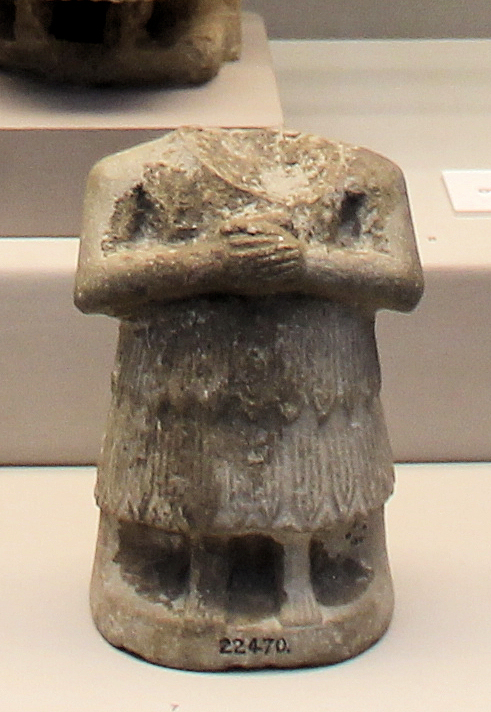
Statue dedicated to the goddess Ninshubur of the city of Der by Enzi and his son Amar-kiku (2400 BCE), British Museum, BM 22470.

=== Early Bronze ===
Der was occupied from the Early Dynastic period through Neo-Assyrian times. The local deity of the city was named Ishtaran, represented on Earth by his minister, the snake god Nirah.

==== Ur III period ====
In the late 3rd millennium, during the reign of Sulgi of the Third Dynasty of Ur, Der was mentioned twice. The Sulgi year name 11 was named "Year Ishtaran of Der was brought into his temple", and year 21 was named "Year Der was destroyed". During the time of Amar-Sin, when the king launched a long military campaign against Huhnuri, prince Shu-Sin, crown prince, left his post in Der to return and hold Ur.

=== Middle Bronze ===
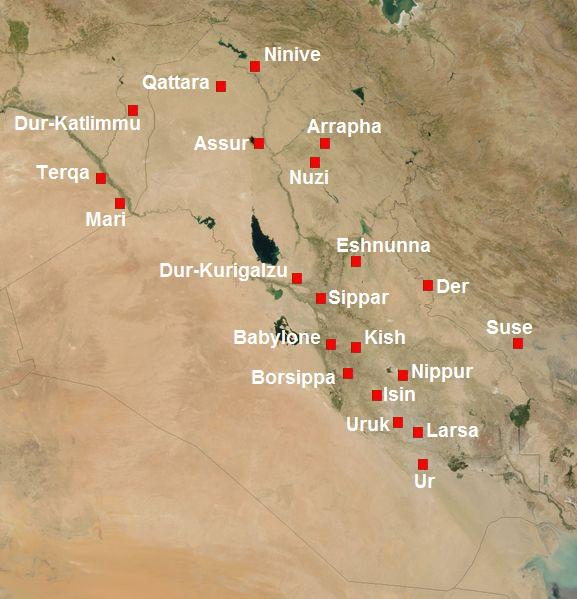
Meso2mil

In the second millennium, Der was mentioned in a tablet discovered at Mari sent by Yarim-Lim I of Yamhad; the tablet includes a reminder to Yasub-Yahad king of Der about the military help given to him for fifteen years by Yarim-Lim, followed by a declaration of war against the city in retaliation for what Yarim-Lim described as evil deeds committed by Yasub-Yahad. Rim-Sin I of Larsa reported destroying Der in his 20th year. Ammi-Ditana of Babylon also recorded destroying the city wall of Der in his 37th year, that he said had been built earlier by Damqi-ilishu of the Sealand Dynasty.

In an inscription little known early Old Babylonian period ruler of Der, Ilum-muttabbil, claimed defeating the armies of Anshan, Elam, and Simaski, in alliance with Marhaši.

=== Iron Age ===
In 720 BC the Assyrian king Sargon II moved against Elam, but the Assyrian host was defeated near Der by the combined army of king Humban-Nikash I of Elam and king Marduk-apla-iddina II of Babylon. Following the Persian conquest of Babylon in 539 BC, the Cyrus Cylinder mentions repatriating the people and restoring the sanctuary of the god of Der, among other cities.

== Archaeology ==
While it appears that no excavation has occurred at Der, several notable objects have been discovered nearby, including a kudurru (discovered in Sippar) which confirmed the name of the site. The site itself has been heavily damaged by water over the centuries and was considered not worth excavating.

== List of rulers ==
The following list should not be considered complete:

Portrait or inscription	Ruler	Approx. date and length of reign (Middle Chronology)	Comments, notes, and references for mentions
Akkadian period (c. 2350 – c. 2154 BC)
	Unknown	fl. c. 2350 BC	
Portrait or inscription	Ruler	Approx. date and length of reign (MC)	Comments, notes, and references for mentions
Ur III period (c. 2119 – c. 2006 BC)
	Ursin	fl. c. 2050 BC	
	Unknown	fl. c. 2006 BC	
Portrait or inscription	Ruler	Approx. date and length of reign (MC)	Comments, notes, and references for mentions
Isin-Larsa period (c. 2006 – c. 1849 BC)
	Anum-muttabil	fl. c. 1949 – c. 1928 BC	
	Manana	fl. c. 1886 – c. 1881 BC	
	Naqimum	Uncertain	
	Sumu-iamutbala	fl. c. 1855 BC	
	Manium	fl. c. 1849 BC	
Portrait or inscription	Ruler	Approx. date and length of reign (MC)	Comments, notes, and references for mentions
Old Babylonian period (c. 1849 – c. 1600 BC)
	Warad-Sin	r. c. 1818 BC (12 years)	Son of Kudur-Mabuk
	Rim-Sin I	r. c. 1802 BC (60 years)	Son of Kudur-Mabuk
	Yasub-Yahad	r. c. 1741 BC	
	Rim-Sin II	r. c. 1736 BC	Nephew of Rim-Sin I (?)
Portrait or inscription	Ruler	Approx. date and length of reign (MC)	Comments, notes, and references for mentions
Middle Elamite period (c. 1600 – c. 1000 BC)
	Lakti-Shikhu	fl. c. 1110 BC	
Portrait or inscription	Ruler	Approx. date and length of reign (MC)	Comments, notes, and references for mentions
Neo-Elamite period (c. 1000 – c. 500 BC)
	Unknown	fl. c. 819 BC	
	Tandaia	fl. c. 668 BC	
	Tammaritu I	fl. c. 653 – c. 644 BC	Son of Urtak (?)

== See also ==
- List of cities of the ancient Near East
- Tell
