= Ummanigash (son of Urtak) =

Elamite king, 7th-century BC

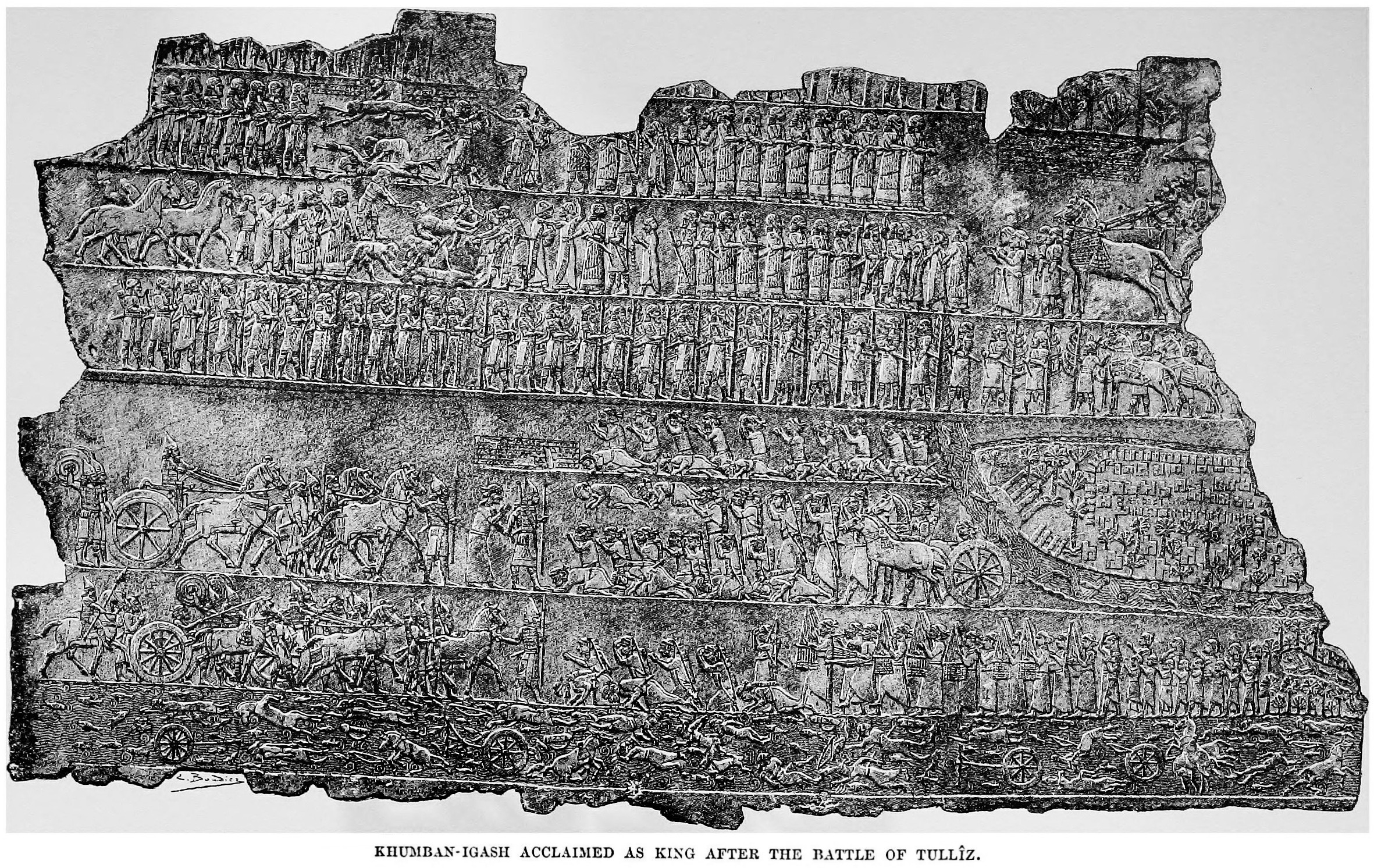
- Ummanigash and Tammaritu acclaimed as rulers of Elam after the Battle of Ulai. British Museum.

King of Elam
- Reign: c. 653 – 652 BCE
- Predecessor: Teumman
- Successor: Tammaritu II
- Dynasty: Humban-Tahrid dynasty ("Neo-Elamite")
- Father: Urtak

Ummanigash was briefly (r. 653–652 BCE) a ruler in the ancient kingdom of Elam, ruling after the beheading of his predecessor Teumman in 653. He ruled part of Elam while his brother, Tammaritu, ruled another. He is also referred to as Humban-nikash II and Khumban-nikash II.

== Biography ==
Urtak, the father of Ummanigash and Tammaritu, had ruled Elam from 675 to 664, at which point he died and was succeeded by Teumman. When Teumman rose to power, Urtak's sons Ummanigash, Ummanappa, and Tammaritu escaped to Assyria in fear of Teumman, and lived under Assyrian protection at Nineveh. Based on his position in an Assyrian lists, Ummanigash was likely the oldest son of Urtak. The Assyrian Ashurbanipal, at the Battle of Ulai, killed Teumman.

After the death of Teumman, the Assyrian king placed Ummanigash as "king" over the Elamite city of Madaktu, and his brother Tammaritu as "king" of Hidalu. Meanwhile, Ashurbanipal faced an attempt by his brother, Shamash-shum-ukin, king of Babylon, to take over the Assyrian Empire. Ummanigash joined this rebellion, sending soldiers to the aid of Shamash-shum-ukin in 652. The Elamite forces were defeated, and shortly thereafter an individual by the name of Tammaritu (not the brother of Teumman) came to power in Elam, likely as a result of the Elamite defeat. This successor of Ummanigash is known to modern history as Tammaritu II.

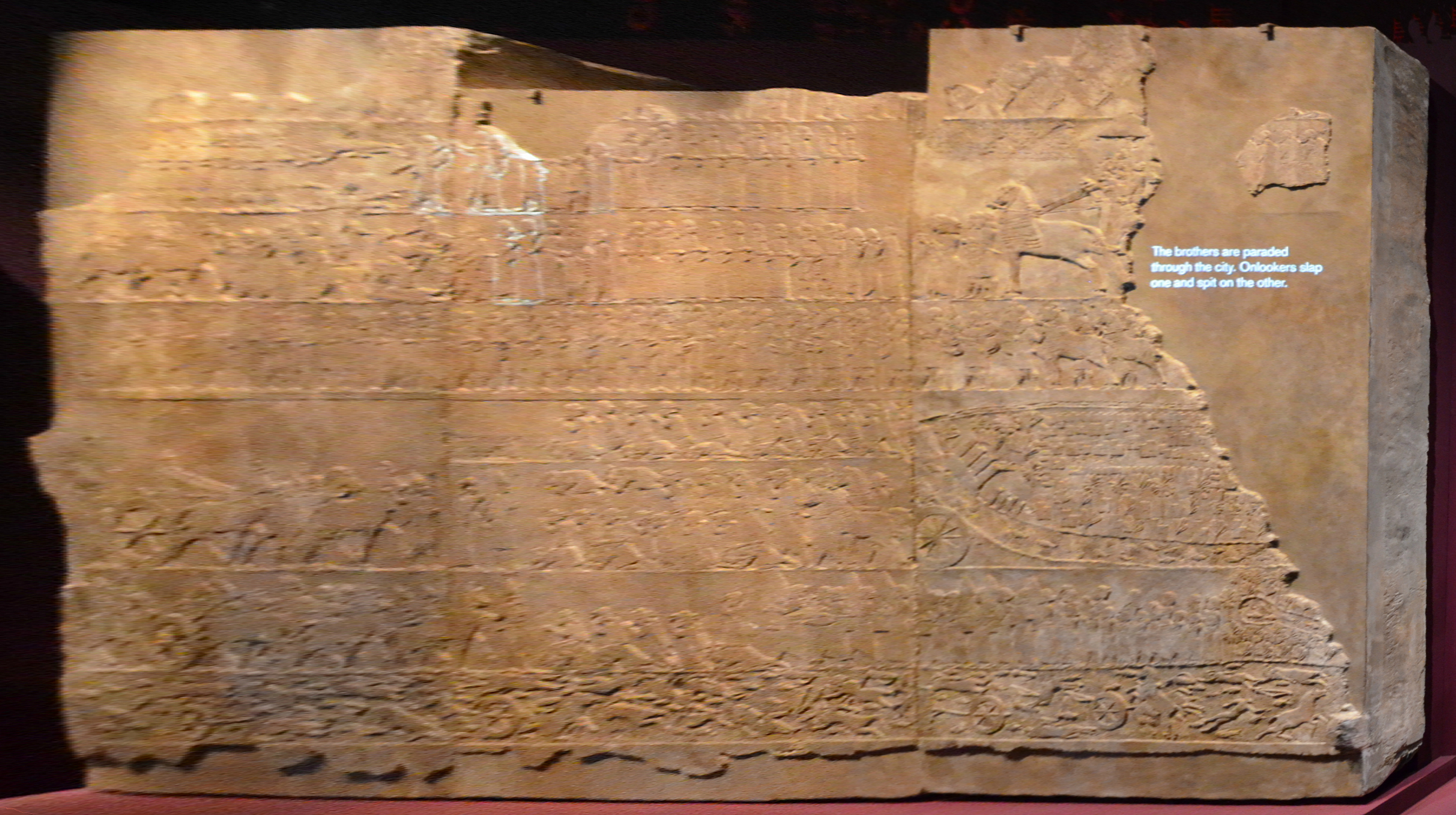
The relief in the British Museum

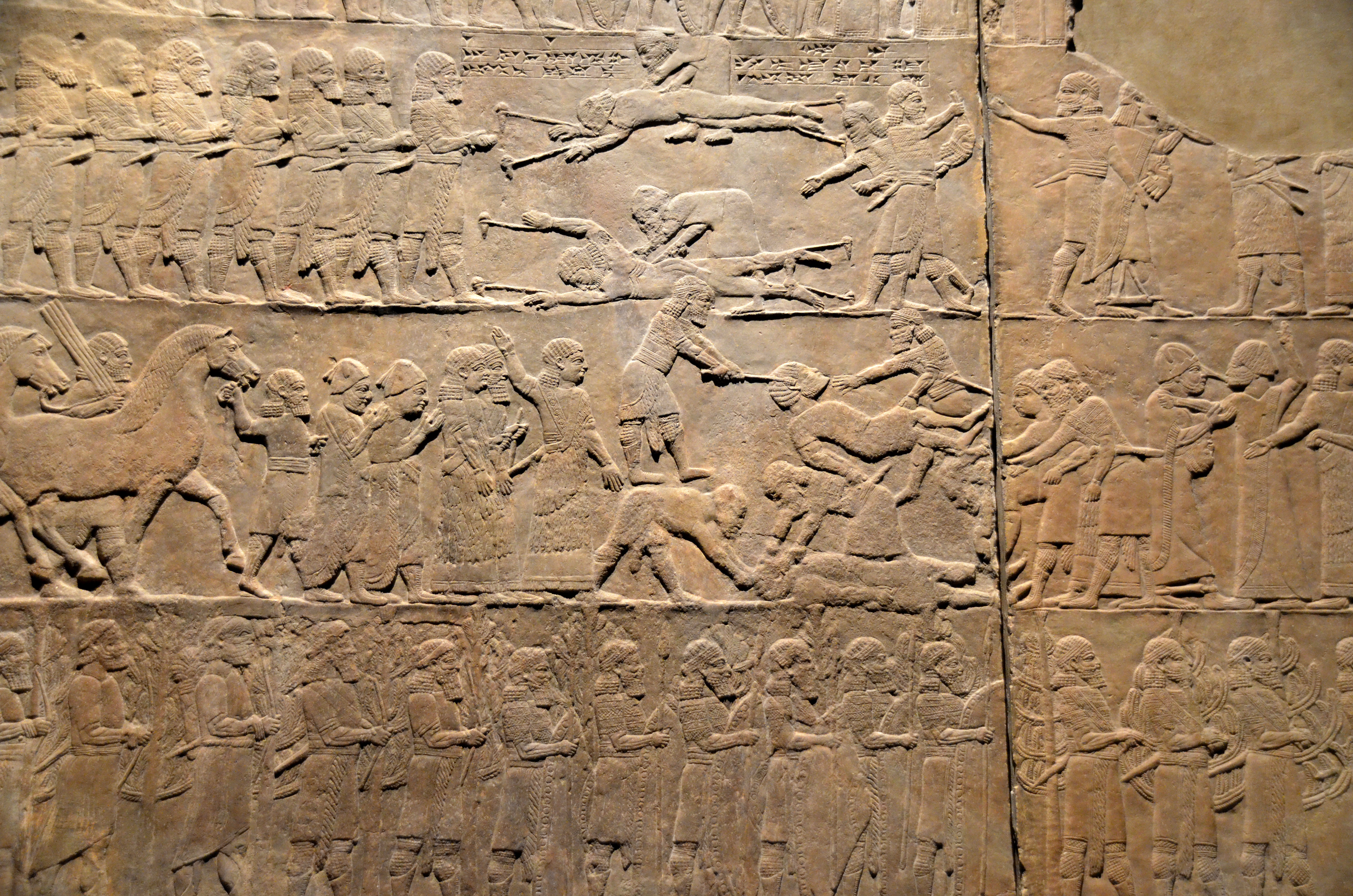
Detail

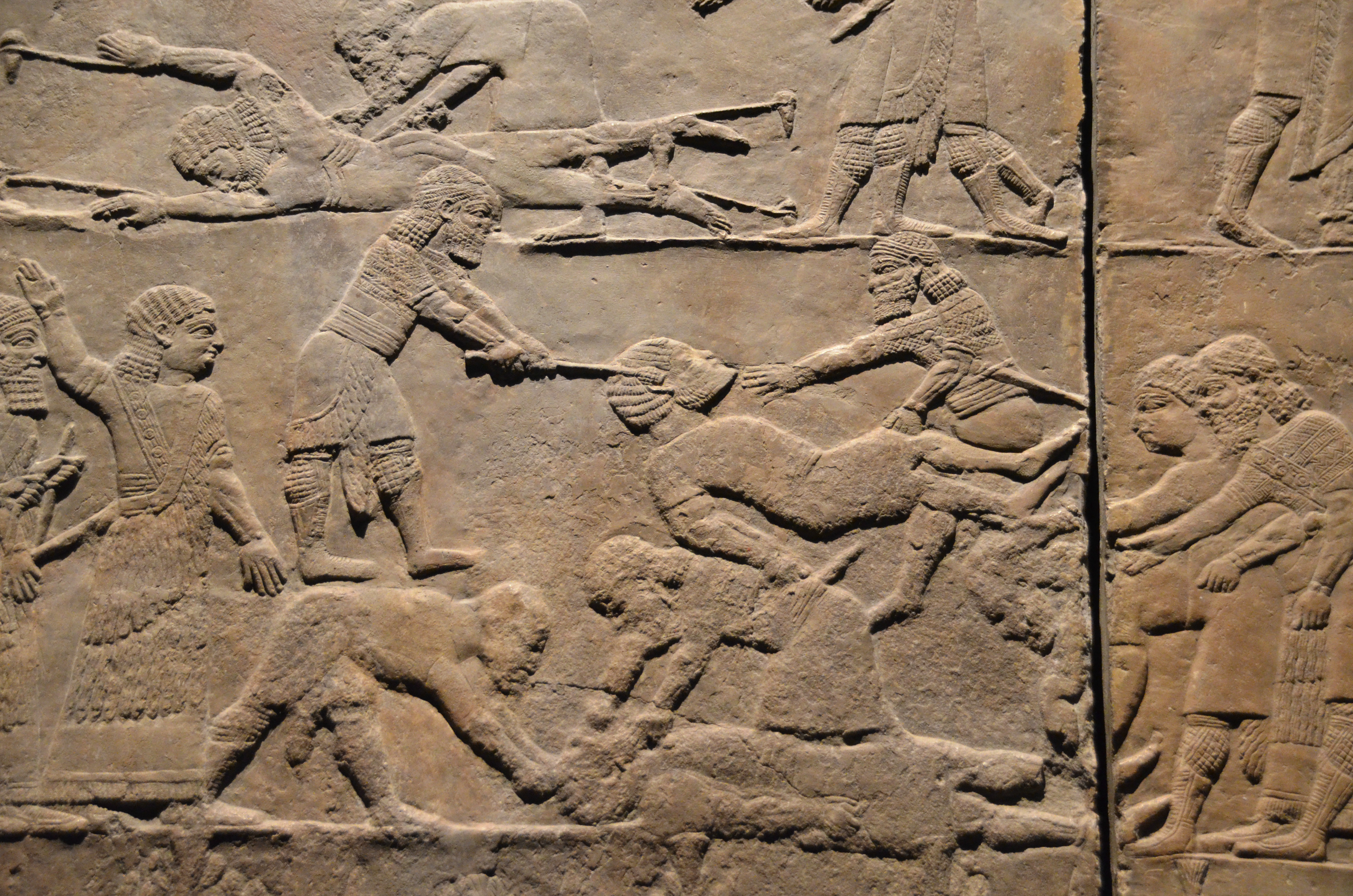
Tongue removal and live flaying of Elamite chiefs after the Battle of Ulai, 653 BCE.

== See also ==
- List of rulers of Elam
