= Tammaritu =

Tammaritu may refer to:

- Tammaritu (son of Teumman) (died 653 BCE), King of Elam from 664 to 653 BCE
- Tammaritu I, ruler of Elam from 653 to 652 BCE
- Tammaritu II, ruler of Elam from 652 until 650 or 649 BCE
