= Tammaritu I =

Elamite king, 7th-century BC

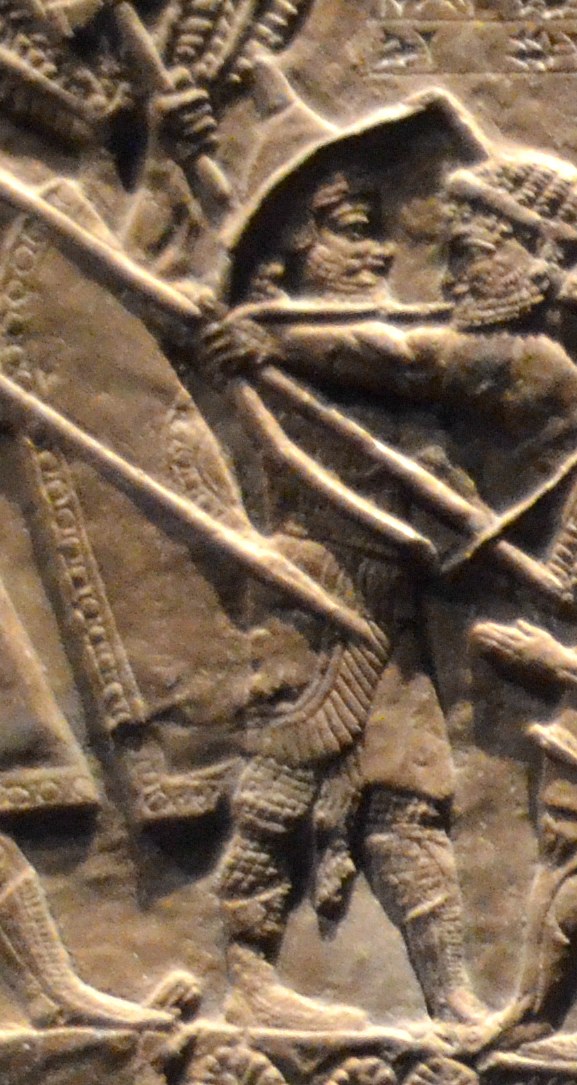
- Tammaritu (behind the bow), son of Urtak, leading Assyrian troops against Teumman, king of Elam, at the Battle of Ulai. British Museum.

King of Elam
- Reign: c. 653 – 652 BCE
- Predecessor: Teumman
- Dynasty: Humban-Tahrid dynasty ("Neo-Elamite")
- Father: Urtak

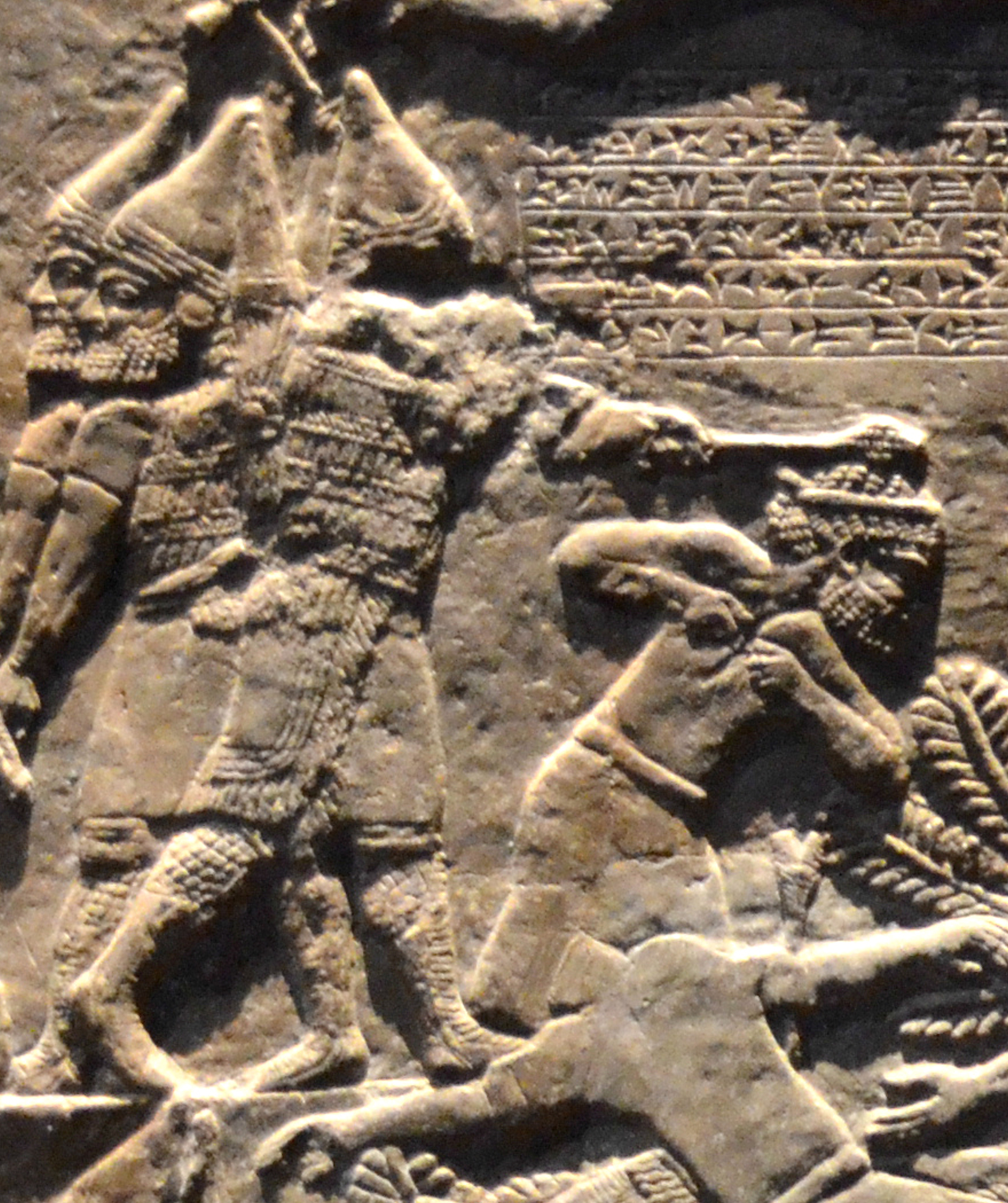
Tammaritu, son of Urtak, killing Tammaritu, son of king Teumman, with a mace, at the Battle of Ulai, 653 BCE

Tammaritu I, son of Urtak, was briefly (from 653-652 BCE) a ruler in the ancient kingdom of Elam, ruling after the beheading of his predecessor Teumman in 653. He ruled part of Elam while his brother, Ummanigash (son of Urtak), ruled another.

Urtak, the father of Ummanigash and Tammaritu, had ruled Elam from 675 to 664, at which point he died and was succeeded by Teumman. When Teumman rose to power, Urtak's sons Ummanigash, Ummanappa, and Tammaritu escaped to Assyria in fear of Teumman, and lived under Assyrian protection at Nineveh. Based on his position in an Assyrian lists, Tammaritu was likely a younger son of Urtak. The Assyrian Ashurbanipal, at the Battle of Ulai, killed Teumman, opening the way for the rule of Tammaritu and Ummanigash.

After the death of Teumman, the Assyrian king placed Ummanigash as "king" over the Elamite city of Madaktu, and his brother Tammaritu as "king" of Hidalu. Meanwhile, Ashurbanipal faced an attempt by his brother, Shamash-shum-ukin, king of Babylon, to take over the Assyrian Empire. Ummanigash joined this rebellion, sending soldiers to the aid of Shamash-shum-ukin in 652. The Elamite forces were defeated, and shortly thereafter an individual by the name of Tammaritu (not the brother of Teumman) came to power in Elam, likely as a result of the Elamite defeat. This successor of Ummanigash is known to modern history as Tammaritu II.

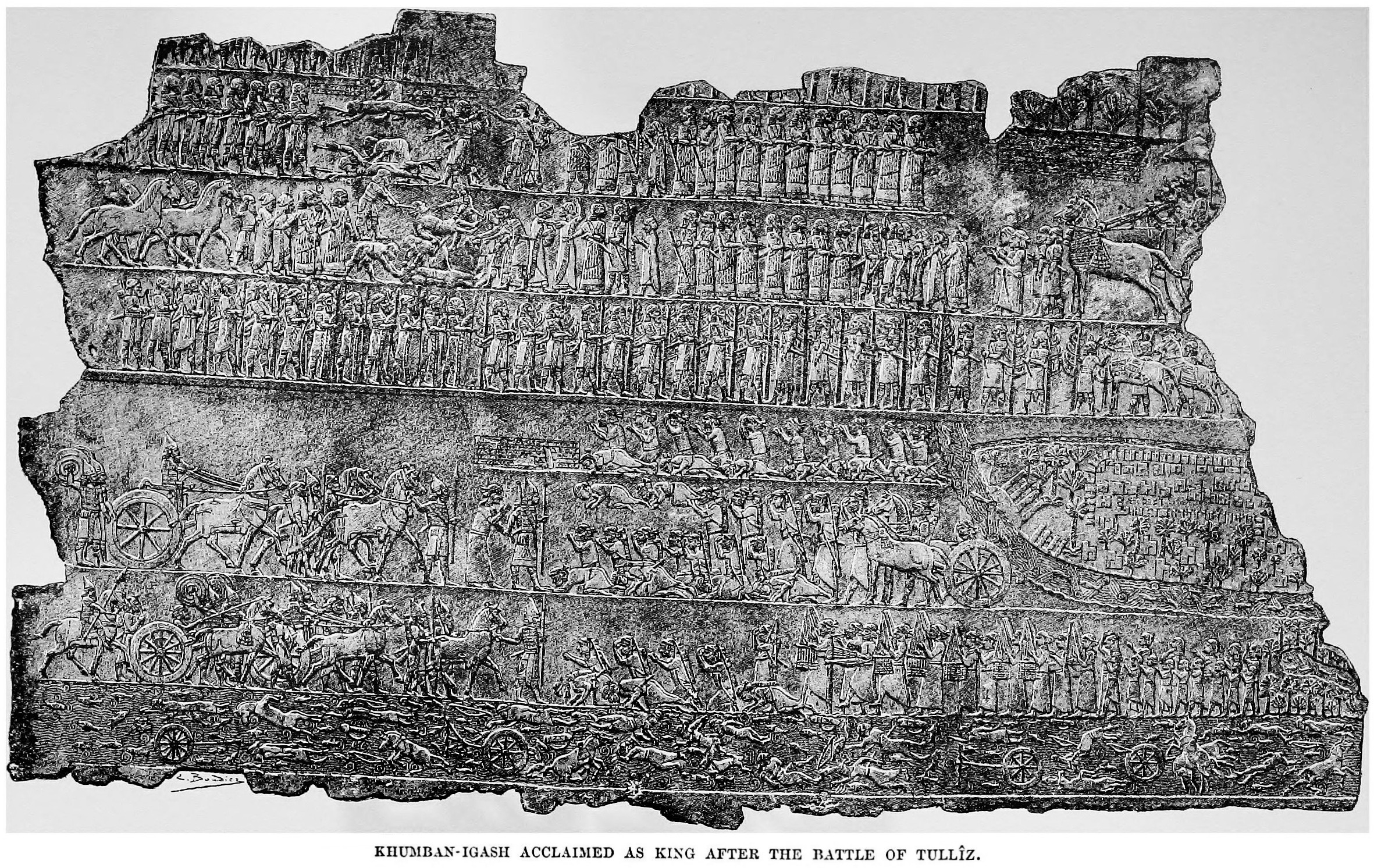
Ummanigash and Tammaritu acclaimed as rulers of Elam after the Battle of Tulliz.

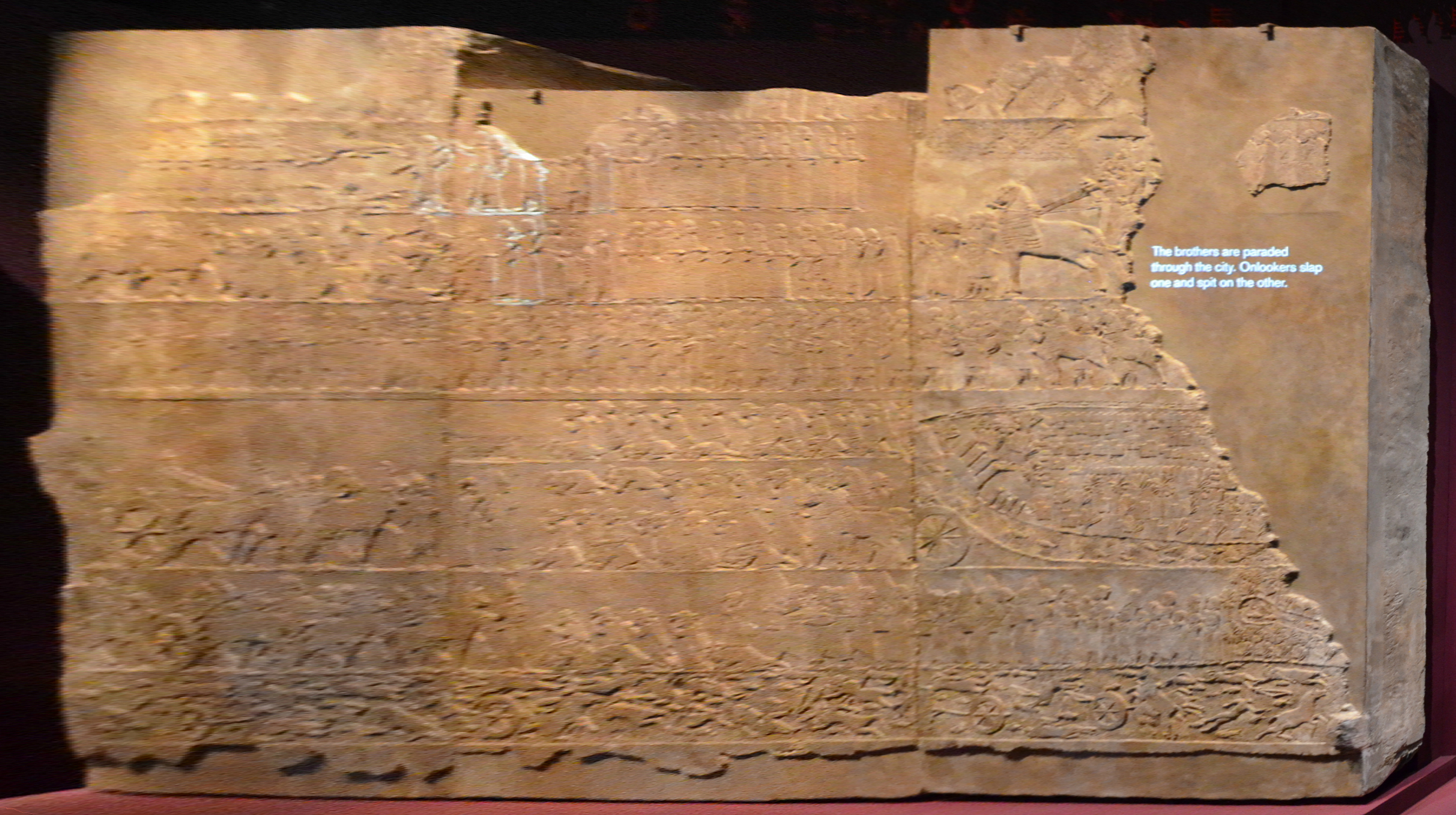
The relief in the British Museum

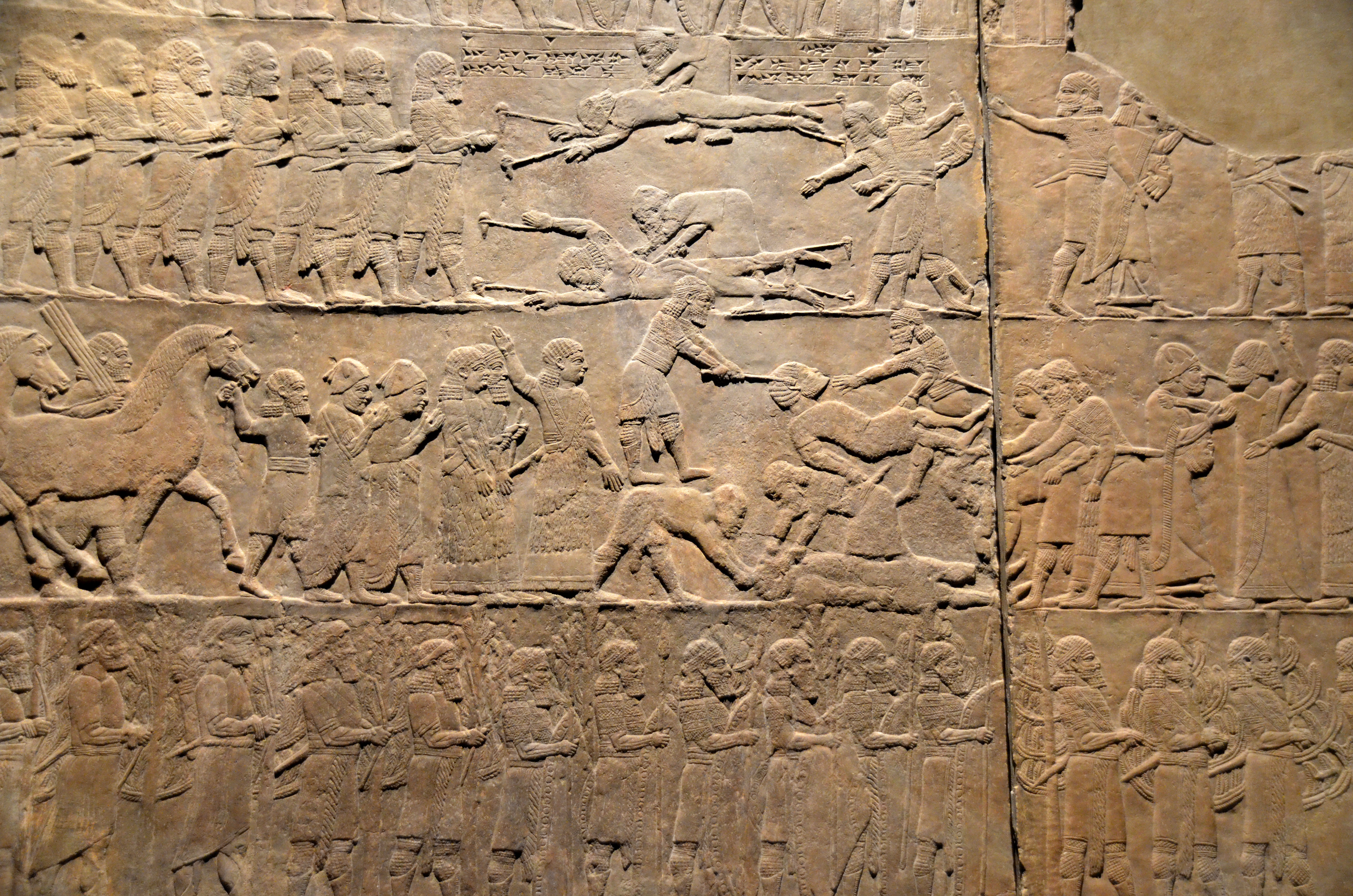
Detail

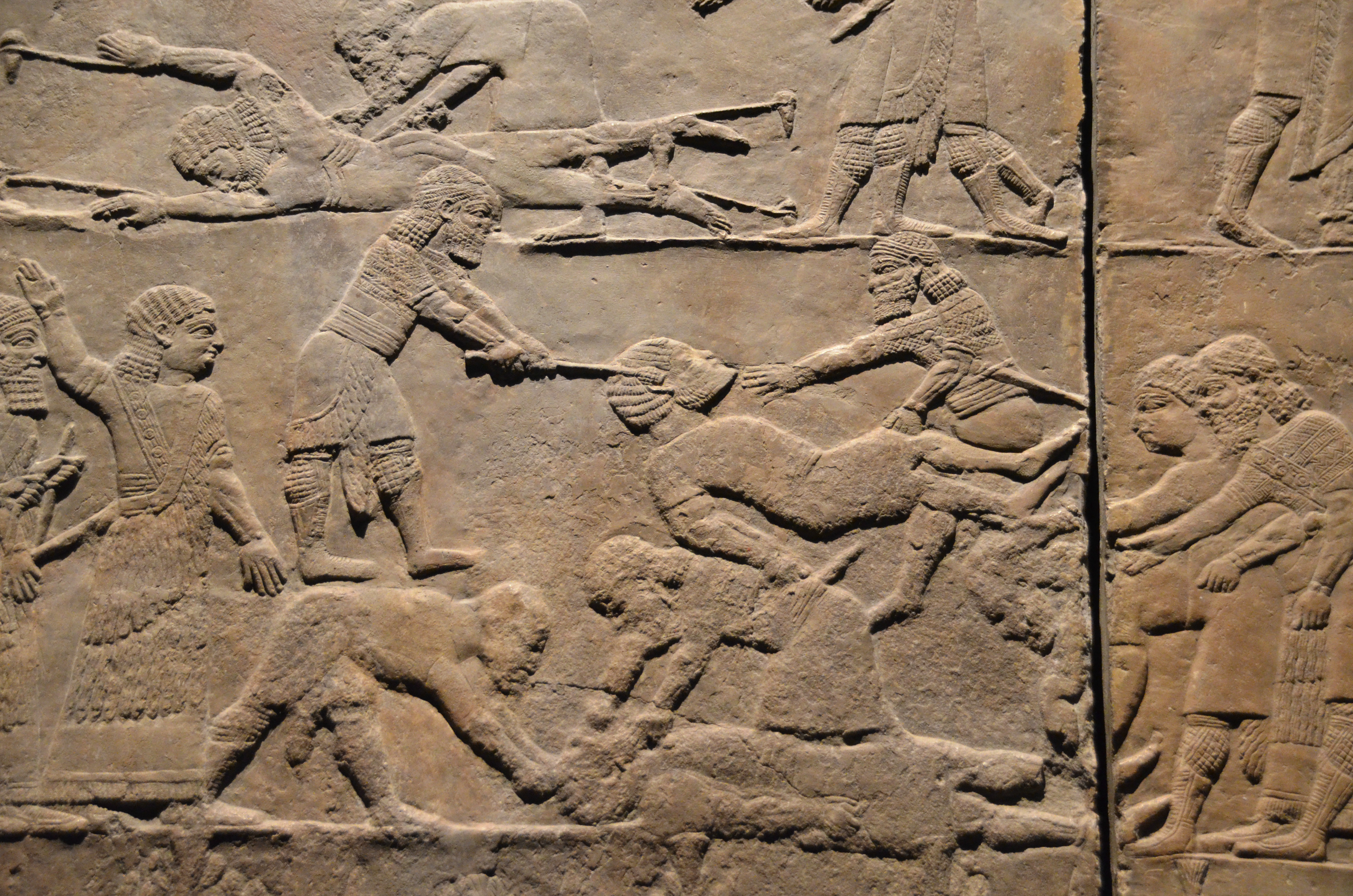
Tongue removal and live flaying of Elamite chiefs after the Battle of Ulai, 653 BCE.

== See also ==
- List of rulers of Elam
