= Šamaš-šuma-ukin =

King of Babylon as a vassal of the Neo-Assyrian Empire

- King of Babylon; King of Sumer and Akkad; King of the Four Corners of the World; King of the Universe
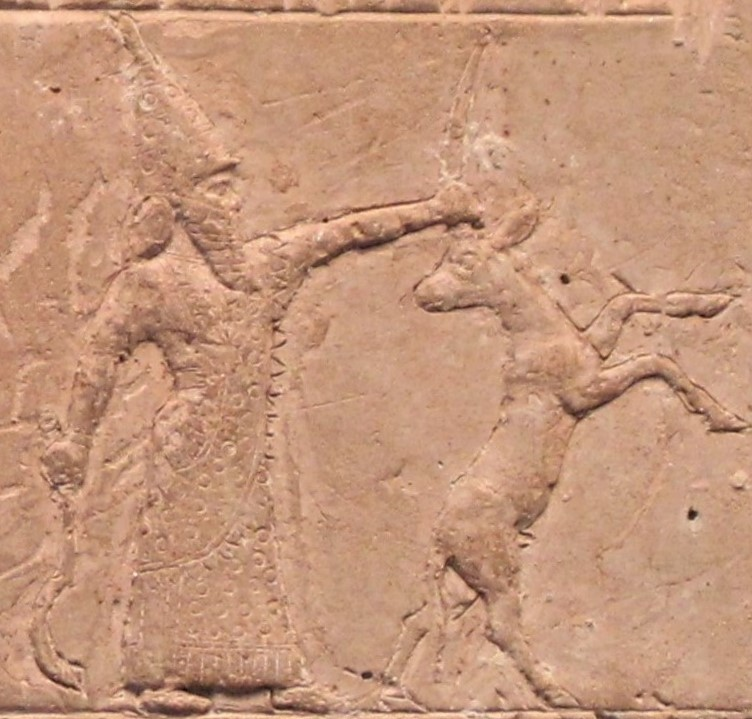
- Šamaš-šuma-ukin, as king of Babylon, depicted on a tablet recording his confirmation of a grant

King of Babylon
- Reign: 668–648 BC
- Predecessor: Esarhaddon
- Successor: Kandalanu
- Born: before 685 BC
- Died: 648 BC
- Akkadian: Šamaš-šuma-ukin; Šamaš-šumu-ukīn
- Dynasty: Sargonid dynasty
- Father: Esarhaddon
- Mother: Ešarra-ḫammat

Šamaš-šuma-ukin (Note: Also spelled Shamash-shum-ukin and sometimes alternatively known as Saulmugina or Sarmuge.) (Neo-Assyrian Akkadian: 𒌋𒌋𒈬𒁺, romanized: Šamaš-šuma-ukin or Šamaš-šumu-ukīn, meaning "Shamash has established the name"), was king of Babylon as a vassal of the Neo-Assyrian Empire from 668 BC to his death in 648. Born into the Assyrian royal family, Šamaš-šuma-ukin was the son of the Neo-Assyrian king Esarhaddon and the elder brother of Esarhaddon's successor Ashurbanipal.

Despite being the elder son, Šamaš-šuma-ukin was for unknown reasons bypassed as heir to Assyria. His designation as heir to Babylonia was likely devised by Esarhaddon as a means to counteract future rivalry and jealousy between the brothers. Although Esarhaddon specified that Šamaš-šuma-ukin was to swear an oath of allegiance to Ashurbanipal, the clear primary heir, Šamaš-šuma-ukin was also referred to as Ashurbanipal's "equal brother" and Ashurbanipal was to stay out of his affairs. This part of the succession plans were not upheld by Ashurbanipal after Esarhaddon's death; Šamaš-šuma-ukin only acceded to the Babylonian throne months after Ashurbanipal had become king and was throughout his reign a closely monitored vassal, not entrusted with all of Babylonia or substantial military forces and only allowed to make decisions if they were approved and verified by Ashurbanipal.

Šamaš-šuma-ukin assimilated well into Babylonia, despite being ethnically and culturally Assyrian. His royal inscriptions are far more "quintessentially Babylonian" than those of other Assyrian rulers of southern Mesopotamia, using Babylonian imagery and rhetoric to an unprecedented extent. He participated in the Babylonian New Year's festival and is recorded as partaking in other Babylonian traditions. The Statue of Marduk, the main cult image of Babylon's patron deity Marduk, was returned to Babylon in 668 at Šamaš-šuma-ukin's coronation, having been stolen from the city by his grandfather Sennacherib twenty years prior.

Though Šamaš-šuma-ukin maintained peaceful relations with his younger brother for many years, resentment gradually grew between them due to Ashurbanipal's overbearing control. In 652, Šamaš-šuma-ukin revolted, inspiring the Babylonians to join him and recruiting a coalition of enemies of Assyria, including the Elamites, Chaldeans, Arameans and perhaps the Medes. Though the conflict was initially indecisive, it eventually ended in disaster for Šamaš-šuma-ukin. Babylon was captured by Ashurbanipal in 648 after a lengthy siege and Šamaš-šuma-ukin died, though the exact circumstances of his death are unclear. After his defeat and death there is evidence of a large-scale damnatio memoriae campaign, with images of the king being mutilated, erasing his face.

== Background ==
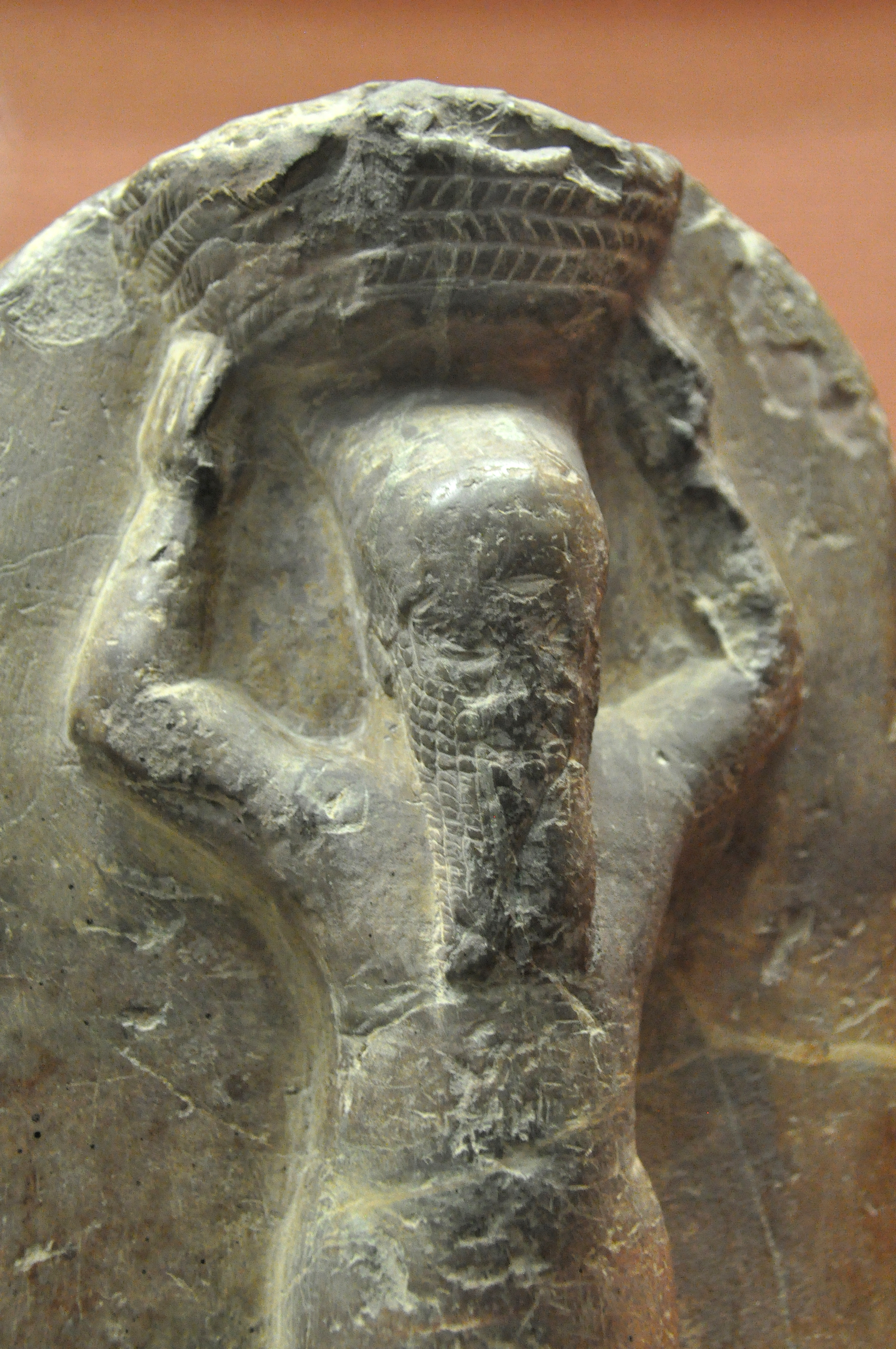
Stone monument of Šamaš-šuma-ukin as a basket-bearer. The face of the sculpture has been mutilated.

Šamaš-šuma-ukin was probably the second eldest son of Esarhaddon, the third king of the Sargonid dynasty, younger only than the crown prince Sin-nadin-apli. Upon the unexpected death of Sin-nadin-apli in 674 BC, the Assyrian court was thrown into upheaval. Esarhaddon had only become king through great difficulty and wished to avoid his own eventual death initiating a succession crisis. He thus soon began to draw up new succession plans. Esarhaddon decided that the fourth-eldest son Ashurbanipal would inherit Assyria, clearly the primary title. Šamaš-šuma-ukin, the next-eldest son after Sin-nadin-apli, was instead designated as the heir to Babylonia, with the two designated as "equal brothers". The third eldest son Šamaš-metu-uballiṭ was entirely bypassed, perhaps because he suffered from poor health. Despite proclaiming his two sons as equals, Esarhaddon also made it clear that Šamaš-šuma-ukin was to swear an oath of allegiance to Ashurbanipal.

After Esarhaddon made his decision, the two princes arrived at the Assyrian capital of Nineveh together and partook in a celebration in May 672 with foreign representatives, Assyrian nobles and elements of the military. Promoting one son as heir to Assyria and the other as heir to Babylonia was a novel idea; for the past decades the Assyrian king had simultaneously ruled Babylonia. The decision to bypass Šamaš-šuma-ukin as heir to Assyria was also a remarkable one, given that Esarhaddon's own accession issues had been the direct result of his father Sennacherib acting in a similar way. Sennacherib had bypassed the elder son Arda-Mulissu in favor of the younger Esarhaddon; in Sennacherib's case this decision led to Arda-Mulissu murdering him and fighting a civil war against Esarhaddon. Why Esarhaddon made nearly the same decision is not clear.

One hypothesis in regard to why a younger son was designated as the heir to what was clearly Esarhaddon's primary title is that Ashurbanipal and Šamaš-šuma-ukin could have had different mothers. Though it is equally likely that Šamaš-šuma-ukin and Ashurbanipal shared a mother, possibly Ešarra-ḫammat (Esarhaddon's primary consort), it is also possible that Ashurbanipal was the son of an Assyrian woman and Šamaš-šuma-ukin was the son of a Babylonian woman; Šamaš-šuma-ukin acceding to the Assyrian throne could thus have been problematic. The decision to grant Šamaš-šuma-ukin Babylonia and designate him and Ashurbanipal as "equal brothers" could perhaps be due to Esarhaddon wishing to avoid the rivalry and jealousy involved in his own accession. If Šamaš-šuma-ukin had Babylonian heritage, Esarhaddon could have surmised that he was a superior candidate for the Babylonian throne.

As crown prince, Šamaš-šuma-ukin would have undergone training for traditional royal duties, such as hunting, riding, scholarship and wisdom, archery, chariotry and other forms of military training. Because Esarhaddon was constantly ill, much of the administrative duties of the empire fell upon Ashurbanipal and Šamaš-šuma-ukin during the last few years of their father's reign. It was important for the crown princes to gain real experience in ruling. Letters of correspondence between Esarhaddon and Ashurbanipal from this time for instance show that Ashurbanipal prominently participated in the Assyrian intelligence network, gathering information on foreign enemies and rivals and compiling reports for his father.

Ashurbanipal immediately became king of Assyria upon Esarhaddon's death. Šamaš-šuma-ukin was somewhat belatedly crowned as king of Babylon in the spring of the next year. His coronation was marked by Ashurbanipal returning the religiously important Statue of Marduk, stolen by Sennacherib twenty years prior, to Babylon. The return of the statue was particularly important as it in the eyes of the Babylonians cemented the approval of Marduk, the Babylonian national deity, of the new king's rule. Though Šamaš-šuma-ukin, an Assyrian prince, being installed as the king of Babylon was in a way an embodiment of Assyrian hegemony, his coronation ceremony (parallelling that of Ashurbanipal) and the return of the Statue of Marduk were efforts made to portray him as an independent king of Babylon. Šamaš-šuma-ukin would rule at Babylon for sixteen years, apparently mostly peacefully in regard to his younger brother, but there would be repeated disagreements on the exact extent of his control; despite the requirement of an oath of allegiance to Ashurbanipal, Esarhaddon had also specified that Ashurbanipal was not to interfere in Šamaš-šuma-ukin's affairs. This part of the succession plans were not upheld by Ashurbanipal, who perhaps shifted the balance of power in his own favor and diminished Šamaš-šuma-ukin's intended status out of fear that his elder brother given a strong power-base would threaten his rule.

== Reign ==
=== Early reign and status ===
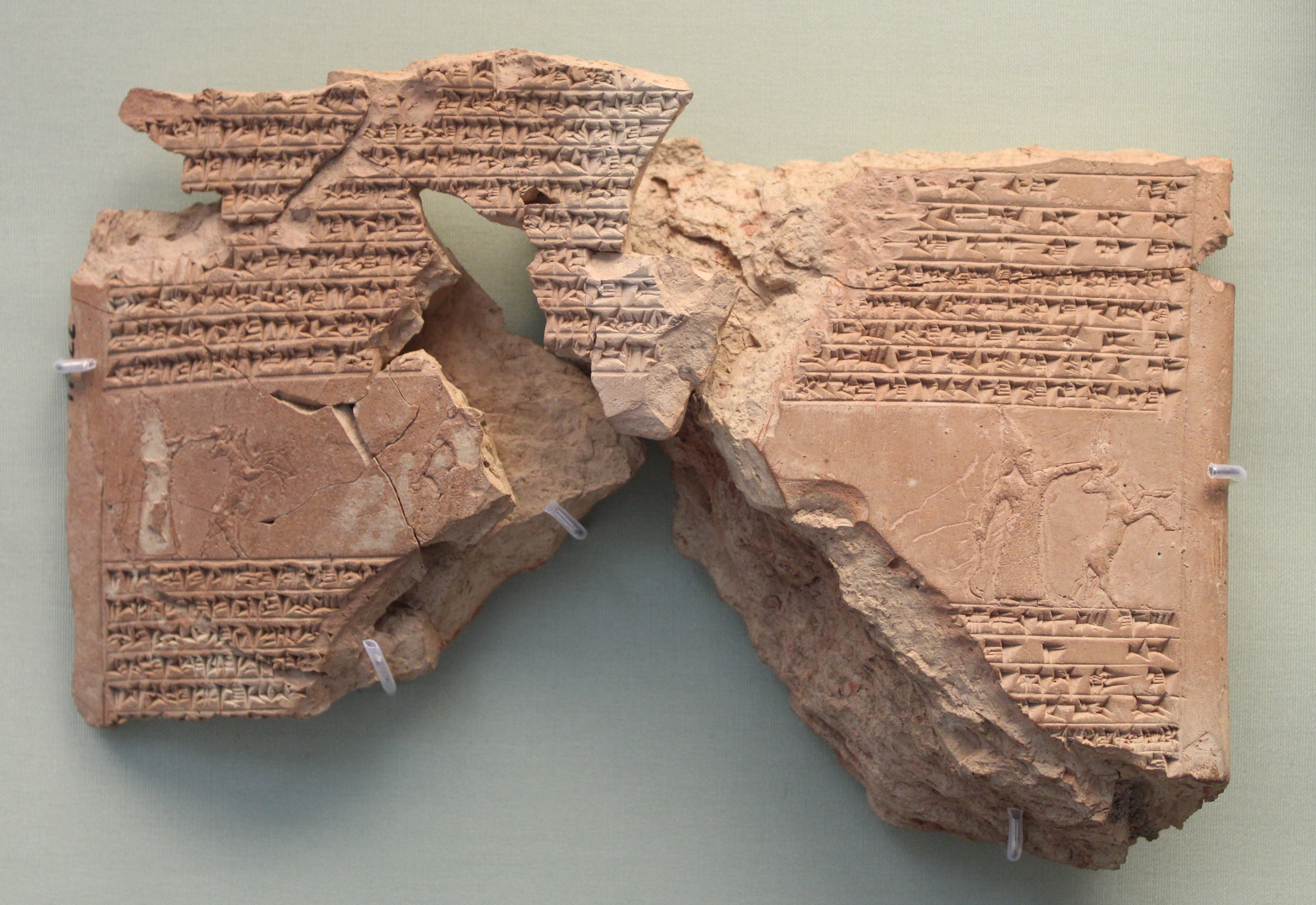
Confirmation by Šamaš-šuma-ukin of a grant originally made by Ashur-nadin-shumi

Šamaš-šuma-ukin was the only member of the Assyrian royal family to accede to the Babylonian throne and intentionally never to the Assyrian one. The only other Assyrian prince who ruled Babylon and not Assyria was Šamaš-šuma-ukin's uncle Ashur-nadin-shumi, though he had been the crown prince of Sennacherib and the intended successor in Assyria as well. Though Ashurbanipal, as king of Assyria, was more powerful, Šamaš-šuma-ukin's kingship of Babylon, important to the Assyrians for military, political, religious and ideological reasons, was prestigious in its own right. He was however very clearly a closely monitored vassal rather than an autonomous ruler. Though Esarhaddon's inscriptions suggest that Šamaš-šuma-ukin should have been granted the entirety of Babylonia to rule, contemporary records only definitely prove that Šamaš-šuma-ukin held Babylon itself and its vicinity. The governors of some Babylonian cities, such as Nippur, Uruk and Ur, and the rulers in the Sea Land, all ignored the existence of a king in Babylon and saw Ashurbanipal as their monarch. Šamaš-šuma-ukin was also not entrusted with any substantial military forces; when the Elamite king Teumman invaded Babylonia in 653, Šamaš-šuma-ukin was unable to defend his country and had to rely on Ashurbanipal for military support.

Šamaš-šuma-ukin is recorded as having participated in several traditional Babylonian royal activities. He rebuilt the walls of the city Sippar and is known to have participated in the Babylonian New Year's festival, which had been suspended during the time that the god's statue was absent from the city. He gave considerable attention to the temples of his domain, confirming offerings in several temples in his inscriptions and increasing the land of the Ishtar temple in Uruk. Šamaš-šuma-ukin was ethnically and culturally Assyrian, but appears to have assimilated well into Babylonia. His royal inscriptions are far more "quintessentially Babylonian" than those of other Assyrian rulers of southern Mesopotamia, using Babylonian imagery and rhetoric to an unprecedented extent, almost as if overriding his actual cultural and ethnic origin as an Assyrian. Though he was in Assyria at some points, such on one occasion when he was feeling sick, Šamaš-šuma-ukin was presumably the first of his dynasty to live in Babylon full-time. Throughout his reign, Šamaš-šuma-ukin partook in several building projects, an important aspect of Babylonian kingship to the same degree as military campaigns were important in Assyrian kingship. He is recorded as restoring shrines in several cities and as rebuilding the city wall of Sippar.

Despite his kingship having been designated by Esarhaddon, Ashurbanipal refers to himself in his inscriptions as the man who granted Šamaš-šuma-ukin rule over Babylon. This is possibly due to Šamaš-šuma-ukin only being formally crowned as king a few months after Ashurbanipal had become the Assyrian monarch. It would also theoretically have been within Ashurbanipal's power to stop Šamaš-šuma-ukin's coronation.

=== Worsening relations ===
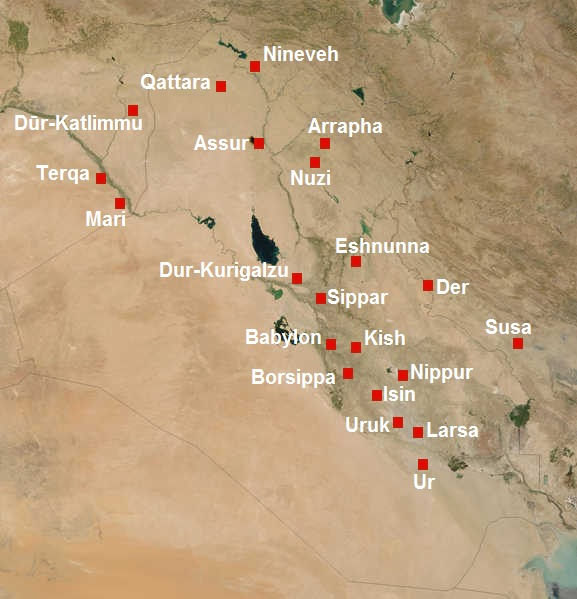
Locations of some major Mesopotamian cities.

The exact reasons for Šamaš-šuma-ukin's revolt against Ashurbanipal are unknown, but there are several possibilities. Perhaps the most commonly believed reason is that although Esarhaddon had designated Šamaš-šuma-ukin to inherit control of all of Babylonia, this had not been respected by Ashurbanipal once Esarhaddon was dead. Although business documents from Šamaš-šuma-ukin are known throughout Babylonia (suggesting that most of the region saw him as their king), similar documents dated to the reign of Ashurbanipal are also known from Babylonia, which suggests that Ashurbanipal had assumed the authority of a Babylonian monarch despite there already being a king in Babylon.

The cities Babylon, Dilbat, Borsippa and Sippar all lack business documents from Ashurbanipal, suggesting that these cities were firmly under Šamaš-šuma-ukin's rule, but Ashurbanipal had agents throughout the south that reported directly to him (not to Šamaš-šuma-ukin) and inscriptions suggest that any orders Šamaš-šuma-ukin gave to his subjects first had to be verified and approved by Ashurbanipal before they could be carried out. Ashurbanipal had a permanent garrison of troops and officials stationed at Borsippa, a city which would have been deep inside Šamaš-šuma-ukin's domain. There are also preserved petitions sent by officials in Babylon directly to Ashurbanipal. Had Šamaš-šuma-ukin been the universally respected sovereign of Babylon, he would probably have been the receiver of such letters.

Royal records from Babylonia during the time of peaceful coexistence between Ashurbanipal and Šamaš-šuma-ukin mention the names of both monarchs, but contemporary documents from Assyria only mention Ashurbanipal, reinforcing that the two kings were not equal in status. Kudurru, who was the governor of Uruk, addressed Ashurbanipal in his letters with the title "king of the Lands", despite Uruk being located in Babylonia, indicating that Kudurru saw Ashurbanipal, and not Šamaš-šuma-ukin, as his overlord. Šamaš-šuma-ukin himself seems to have seen himself as Ashurbanipal's equal, simply addressing him as "my brother" in his letters (unlike how he addressed his father Esarhaddon, "the king, my father"). Although there are several letters preserved from Šamaš-šuma-ukin to Ashurbanipal, there are no known replies preserved. It is possible that Ashurbanipal, on account of his network of informers, did not feel a need to write to his brother.

By the 650s, the relations between Šamaš-šuma-ukin and Ashurbanipal had worsened considerably. A letter from Zakir, a courtier at Šamaš-šuma-ukin's court, to Ashurbanipal described how visitors from the Sea Land had publicly criticized Ashurbanipal in front of Šamaš-šuma-ukin, using the phrase "this is not the word of a king!". Zakir reported that though Šamaš-šuma-ukin was angered, he and his governor of Babylon, Ubaru, chose to not take action against the visitors. Perhaps the most important factors behind Šamaš-šuma-ukin's revolt was his dissatisfaction with his position relative to that of his brother, the constant resentment of Assyria in general by the Babylonians and the constant willingness of the ruler of Elam to join anyone who waged war against Assyria.

=== Revolt against Ashurbanipal ===
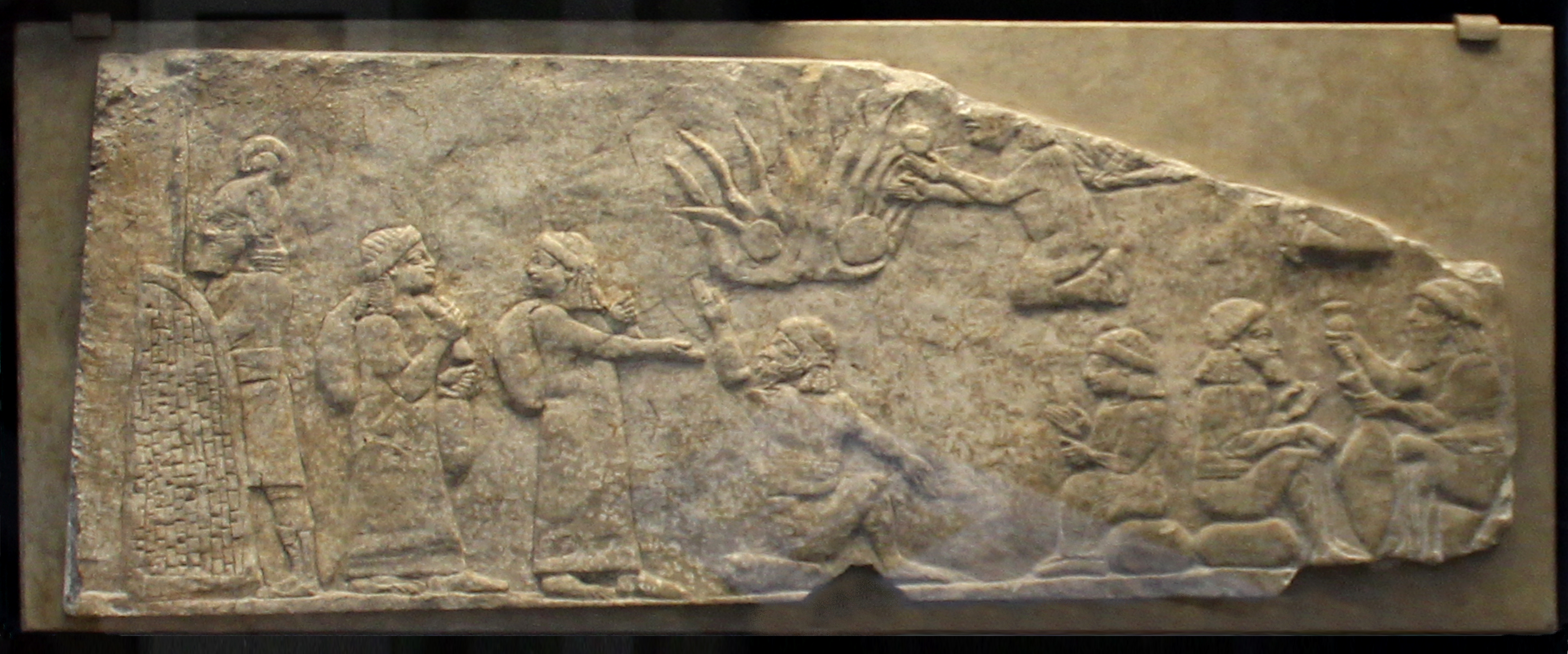
Babylonian prisoners under Assyrian guard in Ashurbanipal's reign

Aspiring to become independent of Ashurbanipal and free Babylonia under his own rule, Šamaš-šuma-ukin revolted in 652. According to later Aramaic-language legends, Ashurbanipal and Šamaš-šuma-ukin's sister Šērūʾa-ēṭirat attempted to intervene and stop the two from fighting; after the war broke out the legends hold that she disappeared into self-imposed exile. The war between the brothers lasted for three years. The rebellion was not an attempt to claim the Assyrian throne, but rather an attempt at securing the independence of Babylonia. Inscription evidence suggests that Šamaš-šuma-ukin addressed the citizens of Babylon to join him in his revolt. In Ashurbanipal's inscriptions, Šamaš-šuma-ukin is quoted to have said "Ashurbanipal will cover with shame the name of the Babylonians", which Ashurbanipal refers to as "wind" and "lies". Soon after Šamaš-šuma-ukin began his revolt, the rest of southern Mesopotamia rose up against Ashurbanipal alongside him. Early in the war, Ashurbanipal tried to get various local governors in the south to join his side instead, writing to them in hopes that some of them might be interested in de-escalating the war. In these letters, Ashurbanipal never refers to Šamaš-šuma-ukin by name, instead calling him lā aḫu ("no-brother"). In many inscriptions, Šamaš-šuma-ukin is simply identified as the "unfaithful brother", "enemy brother" or just "the enemy". In some of the letters Ashurbanipal referred to him as "this man whom Marduk hates" in an effort to undermine his legitimacy as a Babylonian king.

According to the inscriptions of Ashurbanipal, Šamaš-šuma-ukin was very successful in finding allies. Ashurbanipal identified three groups who aided his brother: first and foremost there were the Chaldeans, Arameans and the other peoples of Babylonia, then there were the Elamites, and lastly the kings of Gutium, Amurru and Meluhha. This last group of kings might refer to the Medes (as Gutium, Amurru and Meluhha no longer existed at this point) but this is uncertain. Meluhha might have referred to Egypt, though the Egyptians are not documented to have aided Šamaš-šuma-ukin in the war. Šamaš-šuma-ukin's ambassadors to the Elamites had offered gifts (called "bribes" by Ashurbanipal) and their king, Ummanigash, sent an army under the command of Undashe, the son of Teumman, to aid in the conflict.

For the first two years of the conflict, battles were fought all across Babylonia, some won by the Assyrians and some won by Šamaš-šuma-ukin and his allies. The war quickly turned chaotic; several minor players repeatedly changed sides and both Ashurbanipal and Šamaš-šuma-ukin found it difficult to keep track of their allies. Among the most notorious double agents were Nabu-bel-shumati, a governor of the far south in Babylonia whose repeated betrayals enraged Ashurbanipal.

=== Siege of Babylon and death ===
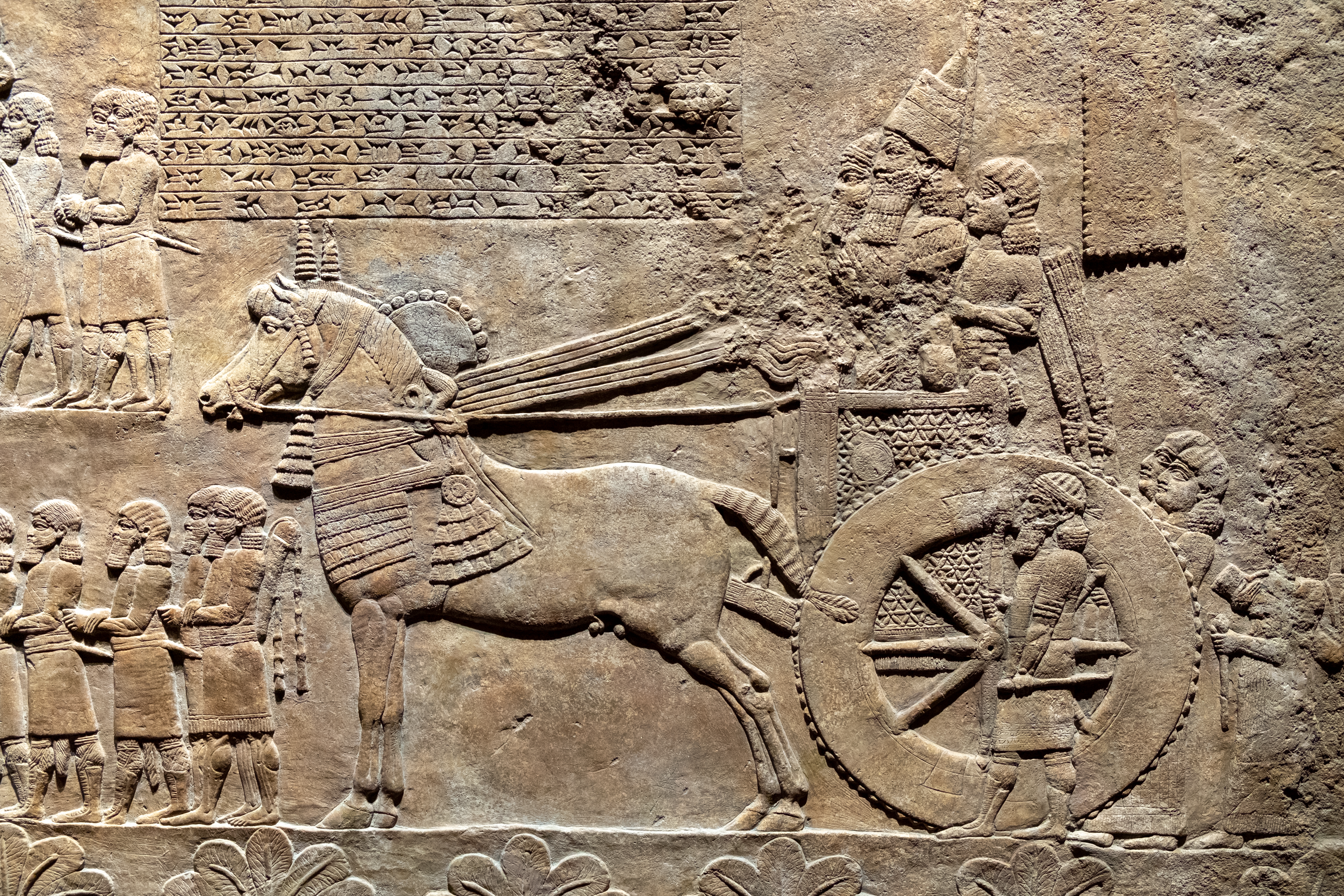
Ashurbanipal inspects booty and prisoners from Babylon after the 648 BC siege

Despite the coalition of Assyrian enemies he had assembled, Šamaš-šuma-ukin's revolt was unsuccessful. The coalition failed to halt Ashurbanipal's advance and Šamaš-šuma-ukin's forces, allies and lands were gradually lost. The Elamites, his primary ally, were defeated near Der and ceased to play a role in the conflict. By 650 Šamaš-šuma-ukin's situation looked grim, with Ashurbanipal's forces having besieged Sippar, Borsippa, Kutha and Babylon itself. During the siege of Babylon, the city entered into a period of famine. Ashurbanipal's account of the siege claimed that some of the citizens grew so hungry and desperate that they ate their own children. After enduring the siege for two years, Babylon finally fell in 648 and was plundered by the Assyrian army. Ashurbanipal initiated a bloodbath in the city, described in detail in his later inscriptions: "their carved up bodies I fed to dogs, to pigs, to wolves, to eagles, to birds of the heavens, to fishes of the deep". One of Šamaš-šuma-ukin's recorded prayers records his despair in the final stages of the war:

I moan like a dove night and day; I bemoan myself, I weep bitterly; Tears are forced from my eyes.

At the time Babylon fell to Ashurbanipal, a great fire spread within the city. Šamaš-šuma-ukin's fate is not entirely clear. He is traditionally believed by historians to have committed suicide by setting himself on fire in his palace, but contemporary texts only say that he "met a cruel death" and that the gods "consigned him to a fire and destroyed his life". In addition to suicide through self-immolation or other means, it is possible that Šamaš-šuma-ukin was executed, died accidentally or was killed in some other way. Most of the accounts of his death state that it involved fire in some capacity, but do not give more elaborate details. The gods are typically identified as playing a part (perhaps burning him away with fire themselves) due to Šamaš-šuma-ukin's war against Ashurbanipal also being framed by Ashurbanipal as impious. If Šamaš-šuma-ukin was executed, it would be logical for the Assyrian scribes to leave this out of historical records since fratricide (killing a brother) was illegal and even if a soldier (and not Ashurbanipal) had carried it out, it would still constitute a murder of a member of the Assyrian royal family. Had a soldier killed Šamaš-šuma-ukin, he might very well have been executed himself. After Šamaš-šuma-ukin's death, Ashurbanipal placed one of his officials, Kandalanu, on the Babylonian throne as his vassal.

== Legacy ==
Šamaš-šuma-ukin's rebellion and downfall represented a difficult case for the Assyrian royal scribes who recorded history. As Šamaš-šuma-ukin was both a member of the Assyrian royal family and a traitorous Babylonian king, it was difficult to write of his fate; while scribes eagerly recorded lengthy accounts of the defeat of foreign kings and rebels, there was a general reluctance to write about the death of members of the Assyrian royal family. Matters might have been complicated further by the fact that unlike many other rebels faced by the Assyrians, Šamaš-šuma-ukin was not a usurper, but the legitimately installed ruler of Babylon, by decree of an Assyrian king.

Ashurbanipal's personal inscriptions offer little in regards to the end of Šamaš-šuma-ukin's life and Assyrian kings after Ashurbanipal do not mention him at all, almost as if he had never existed in the first place. Ashurbanipal's inscriptions talk around his brother's death and in many places even omit Šamaš-šuma-ukin's name, simply calling him "the king". In a relief from Ashurbanipal's palace at Nineveh, depicting his victory over the Babylonian revolt, soldiers are depicted as giving the Babylonian crown and the Babylonian royal insignia to him, but Šamaš-šuma-ukin is conspicuously absent. There is evidence of a considerable damnatio memoriae following Šamaš-šuma-ukin's downfall, with steles erected by the king being purposefully mutilated after his death, erasing his face.

== Titulature ==
Šamaš-šuma-ukin's most frequently used title was šar Bābili ("king of Babylon"), though there exists a single inscription where he used šakkanakki Bābili ("viceroy of Babylon") instead. In the inscriptions of other Assyrian kings who ruled the city, "viceroy" is typically more common than "king". He also assumed other traditional Babylonian royal titles, such as šar māt Šumeri u Akkadi ("king of Sumer and Akkad"). Overall, his titulary was quintessentially Babylonian to a much higher degree than other Assyrian rulers of the city. As typically done by Assyrian rulers, Šamaš-šuma-ukin venerated his ancestors in many of his inscriptions, typically naming his great-grandfather Sargon II, his grandfather Sennacherib (from whom he typically omitted the title "king of Babylon" due to Sennacherib's actions against the city), his father Esarhaddon and sometimes his brother Ashurbanipal. Their inclusion in his titles may be because Šamaš-šuma-ukin feared that his legitimacy could be questioned if they were omitted. The specific way his ancestors were presented, and Šamaš-šuma-ukin's use of deities in his inscriptions, set him apart from other Assyrian rulers.

Significantly, Šamaš-šuma-ukin left out any mentions of the role of his royal ancestors as chief priests of Assyria's god Ashur, a concept intrinsically linked to Assyrian ideas of kingship. As expected for a ruler of Babylon, the deity most frequently referenced in Šamaš-šuma-ukin's royal inscriptions is Marduk, but Šamaš-šuma-ukin's inscriptions do not contain a single mention of Ashur, who was otherwise included (though sometimes in a reduced capacity) in the inscriptions of those of his ancestors who ruled both Assyria and Babylonia. Despite Šamaš-šuma-ukin publicly identifying himself as an Assyrian (through his genealogy), his inscriptions thus suggest that he did not venerate Assyria's national deity. In many places in his titles, Šamaš-šuma-ukin appropriated Assyrian titular conventions in regards to how deities were used but substituted the important gods in Assyria, such as Ashur, Ishtar and Sîn, for deities more venerated in the south, such as Marduk and Sarpanit.

== See also ==
- List of kings of Babylon
- Military history of the Neo-Assyrian Empire

== Notes ==
Šamaš-šuma-ukin Sargonid dynasty Died: 648 BC
Preceded by Esarhaddon	King of Babylon; 668 – 648 BC	Succeeded by Kandalanu
