= Battle of Ulai =

Battle between the invading Assyrians and the kingdom of Elam

- Part of the Assyrian conquest of Elam
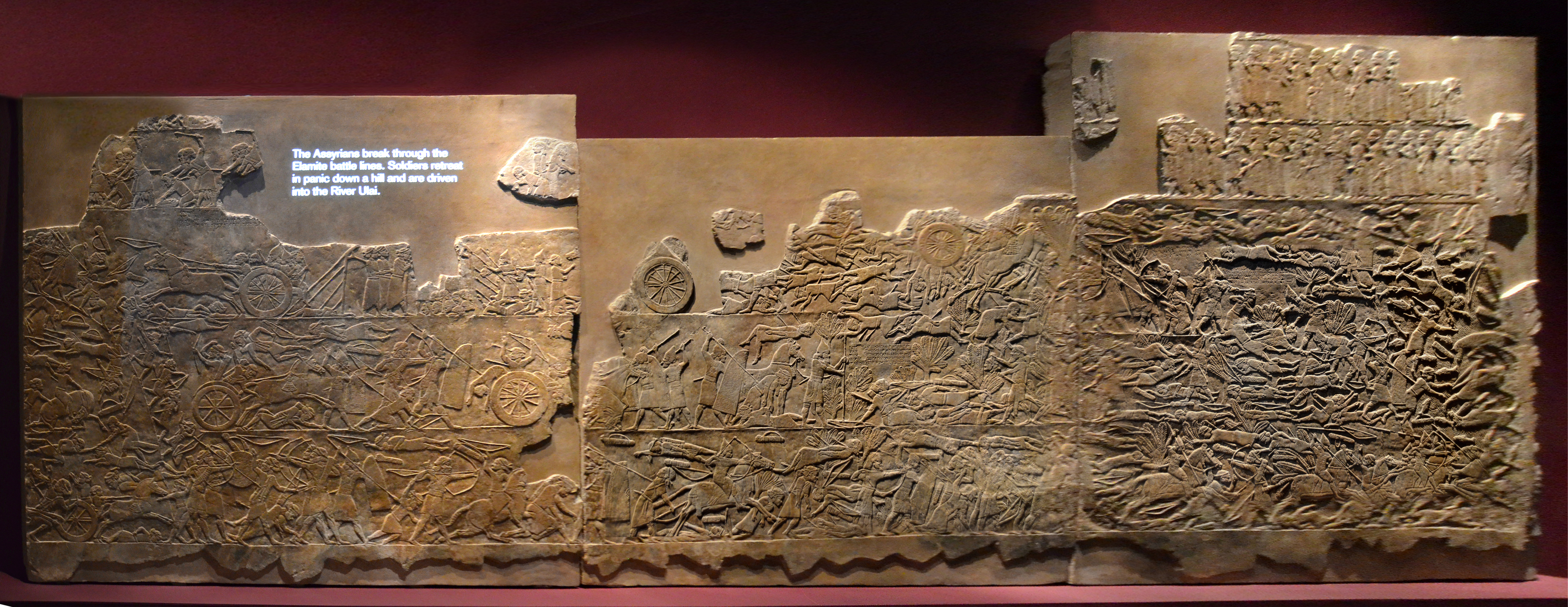
- Monumental relief of the Battle of Ulai, also called the Battle of Tulliz, British Museum.
Date	c. 653 BC
Location	Karkheh River
Result	Assyrian victory

Belligerents
Neo-Assyrian Empire	Elam

Commanders and leaders
Ashurbanipal	Teumman †; Tammaritu †

The Battle of the Ulai River (called in modern times the Kerkha or Karkheh River), also known as the Battle of Til-Tuba or the Battle of Tulliz, in c. 653 BCE, was a battle between the invading Assyrians, under their king Ashurbanipal, and the kingdom of Elam, which was a Babylonian ally. The result was a decisive Assyrian victory. Teumman, the king of Elam, and his son Tammaritu were killed in the battle.

== Background ==
Under the reign of Tiglath-Pileser III (744-727 BCE) through Ashur-uballit II (611 BCE) Assyria led several campaigns across the known world. However Assyria struggled to maintain control over their closest neighbor Babylonia. In a rebellion against Sennacherib's (704-681) rule in Babylon, Chaldean Mushezib-Marduk seized the throne and formed a coalition including the Chaldeans, Aramaens, Elamites, and Babylonians and went to battle in 691 near the city of Halule. The coalition was defeated and Sennacherib began a 15-month campaign against Babylonia, sacking palaces and burning temples. Sennacherib's son, Esarhaddon (680-69) attempted to rebuild Babylonia and establish himself as king. Succeeding him was Ashurbanipal (668-27), who took the throne in Nineveh and Shamash-Shuma-Ukin, who claimed kingship in Babylon and continued to rebuild it. While Babylonia was technically independent of Assyria, the correspondence between the two brothers suggests that Ashurbanipal saw Babylonia as a vassal state and exercised control over it. Shamash-Shuma-Ukin began looking for a chance to rebel.

A few years before, Teumman (or Te'uman, 664-653 BCE), a known enemy of Assyria, had usurped the Elamite throne, forcing the sons of Urtaki to flee to Nineveh, the Assyrian capital. Teumman demanded they be extradited, but Ashurbanipal refused. Teumman began a campaign against Na'id Marduk, Assyria's puppet ruler in the Sealand, around 675 BCE. After pushing out the Assyrian influences, Teumman placed Nabo-usalim on the throne in Ur.

== Battle and aftermath ==
Teumman, Nabo-Usallim and Shamash-Shuma-Ukin all formed a coalition and marched against Assurbanipal and met his forces on the banks of the Ulai River (hence the name "Battle of the Ulai River") where they were defeated.

Pitched battles were not the preferred strategy of Assyrian forces, which were specialized more in siege warfare. But at Ulai, they were still the winners in a battle where the cavalry outflanked the Elamites while foot soldiers attacked the center and drove the enemy into the river.

Teumman was killed in battle and his head was carried to Nineveh and placed on display in Ashurbanipal's court. Ashurbanipal began a 4-year campaign against Babylonia and placed Kandalanu on the throne to replace his brother. Susa, the capital of Elam was sacked in 647 BCE and Elam never regained its power until the Persians conquered it a century later.

=== Relief carvings ===
The Battle of Ulai is well known because of the relief carvings found in Ashurbanipal's palace in Nineveh. These chaotic images portray the torture and death of countless enemy soldiers. The severed head of Teumman can be found in nearly every panel including the panel depicting the king's victory banquet. This is consistent with the Assyrian propaganda "which urges viewers to be both fearful and in awe of Assyrian might".

As an innovation for Assyrian relief art, the cycle of battle is based on the Egyptian depictions of the Battle of Kadesh, which are more than 600 years older.

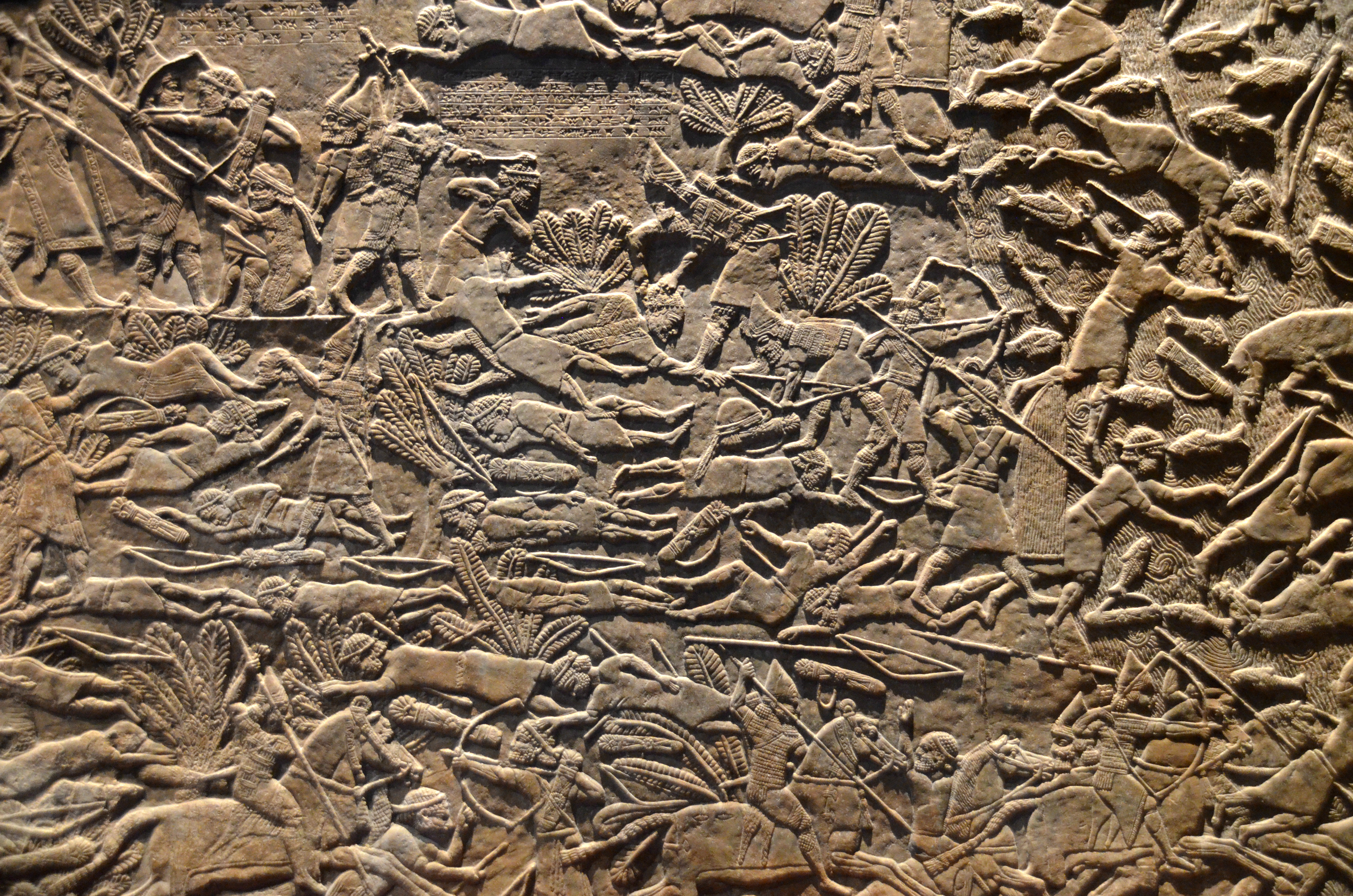
Battle scene

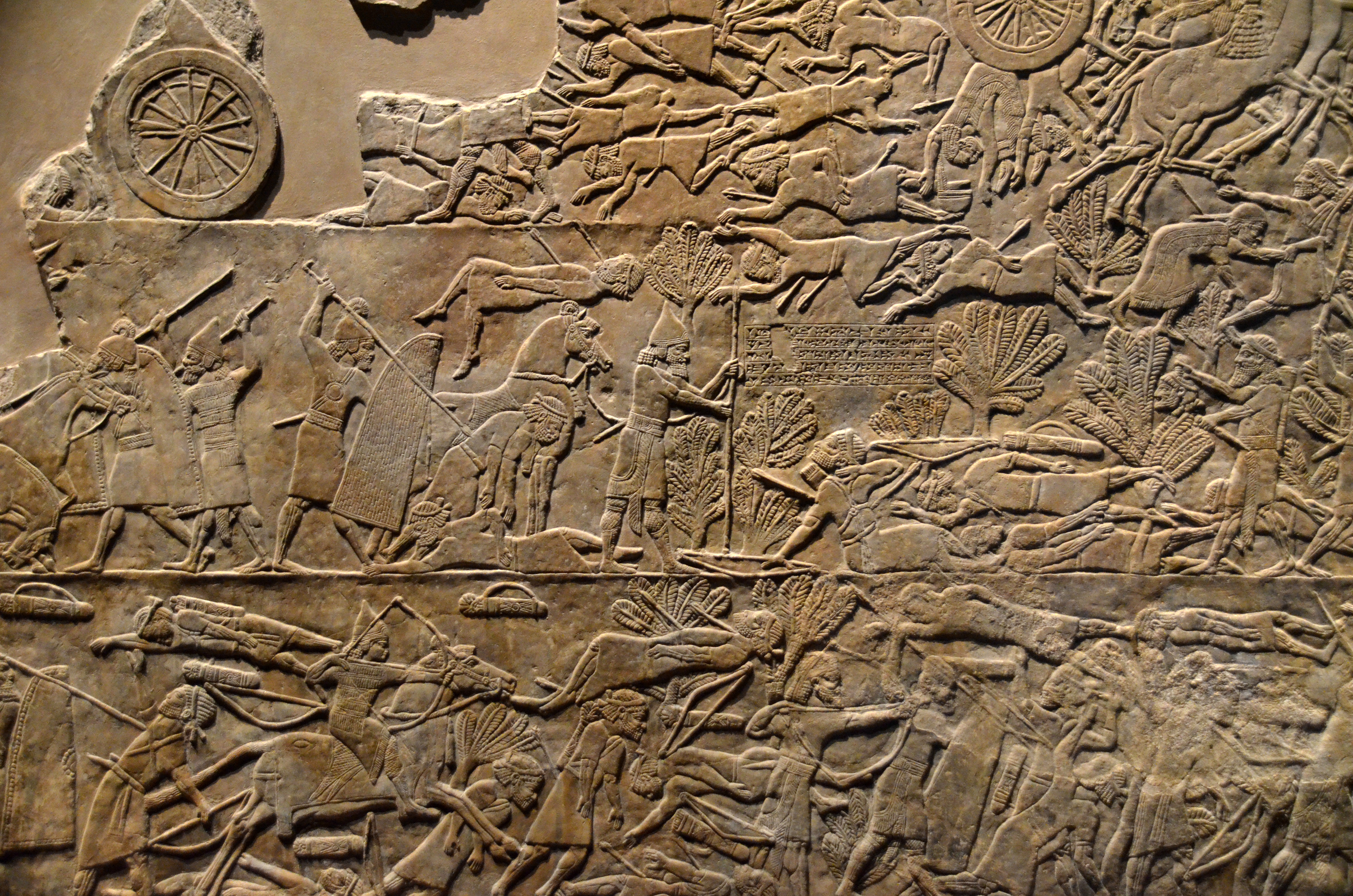
Battle scene

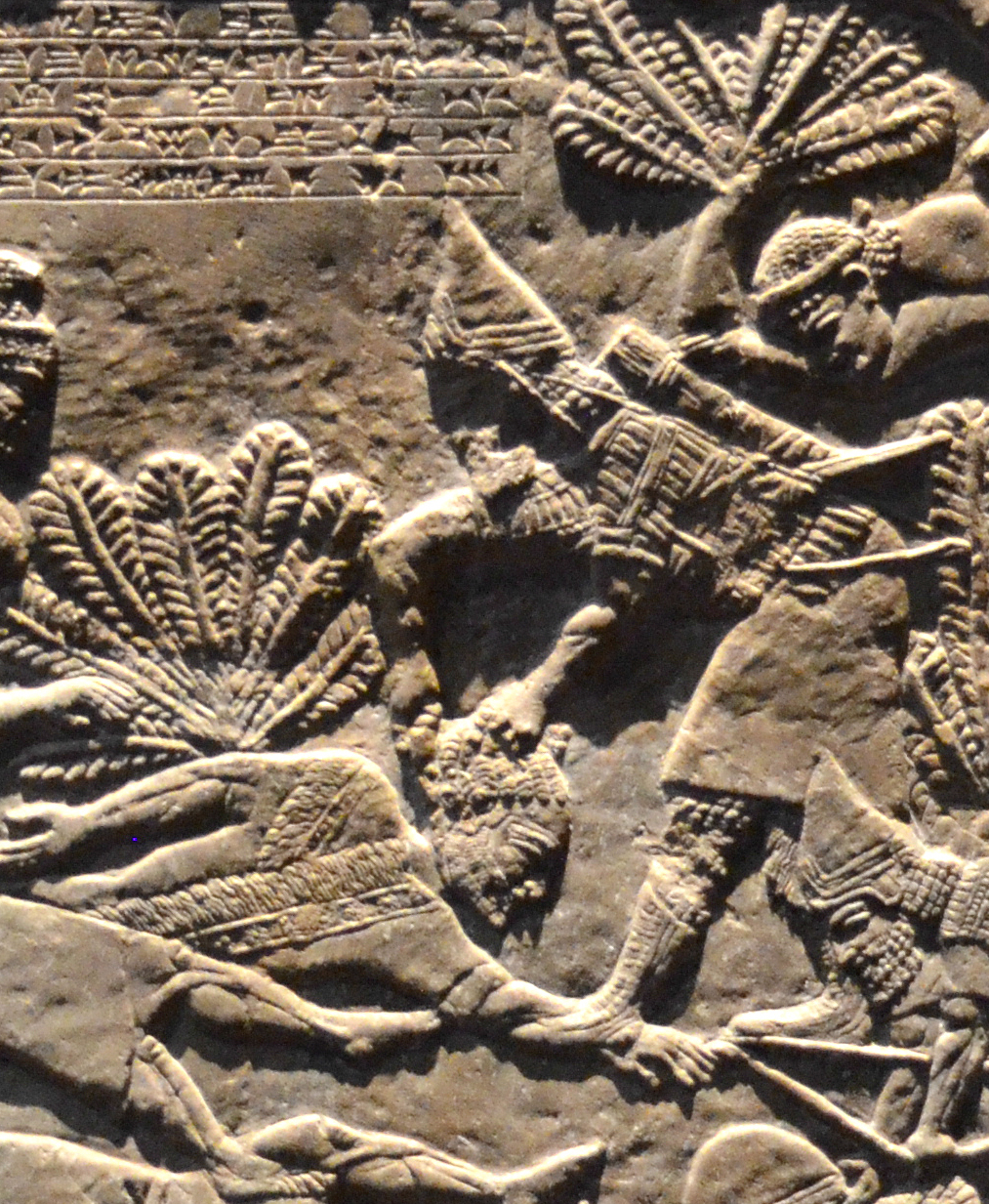
The beheading of King Teumman of Elam.

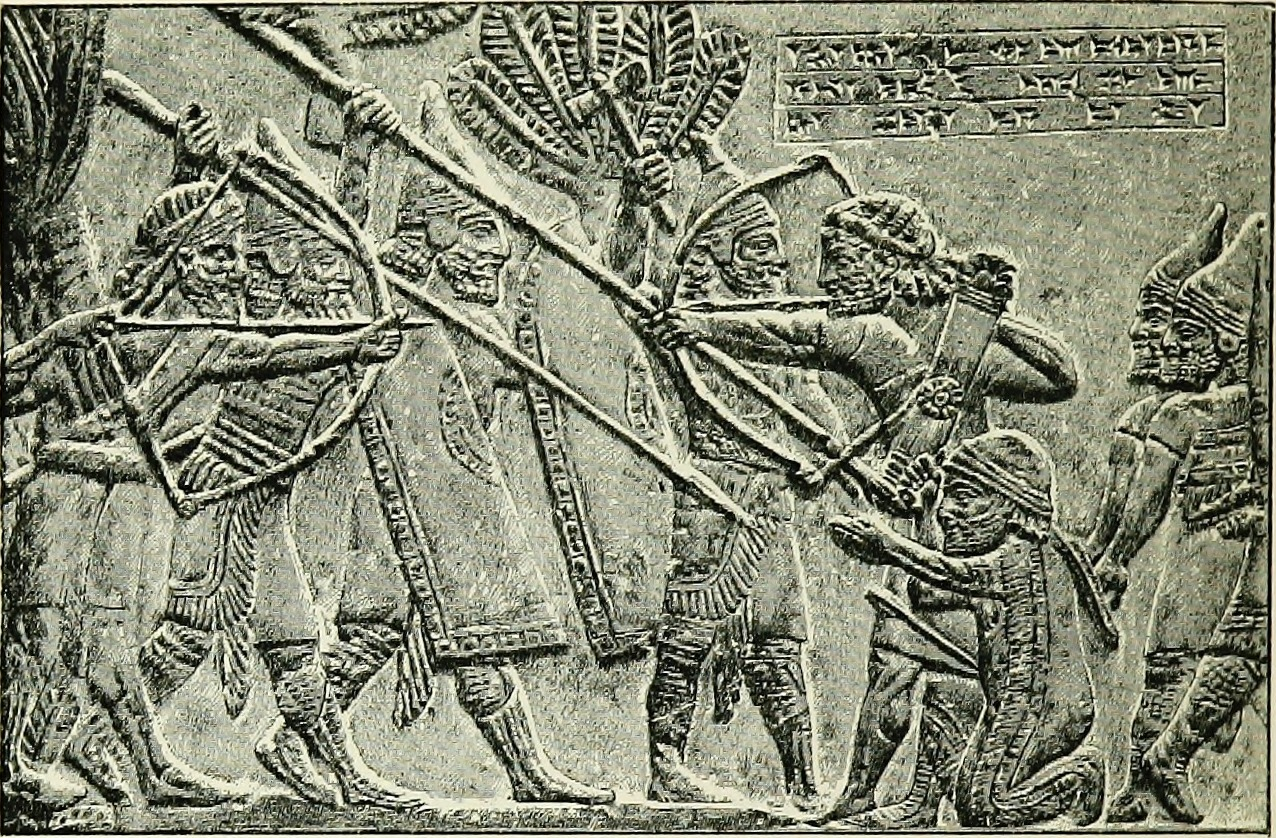
The last arrow of Teumman and his son Tammaritu.

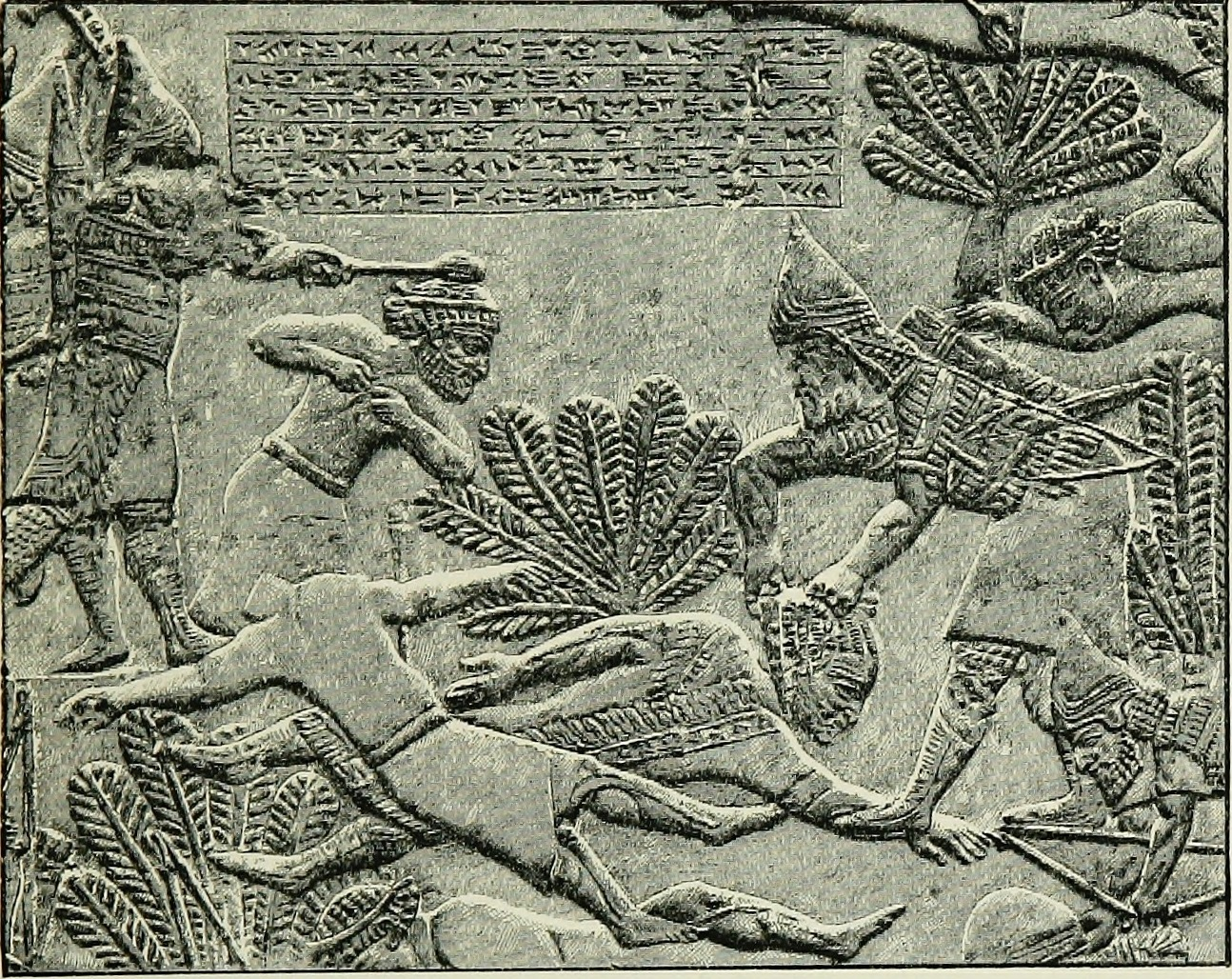
Death of Teumman and his son at the hands of the Assyrians under Ashurbanipal.

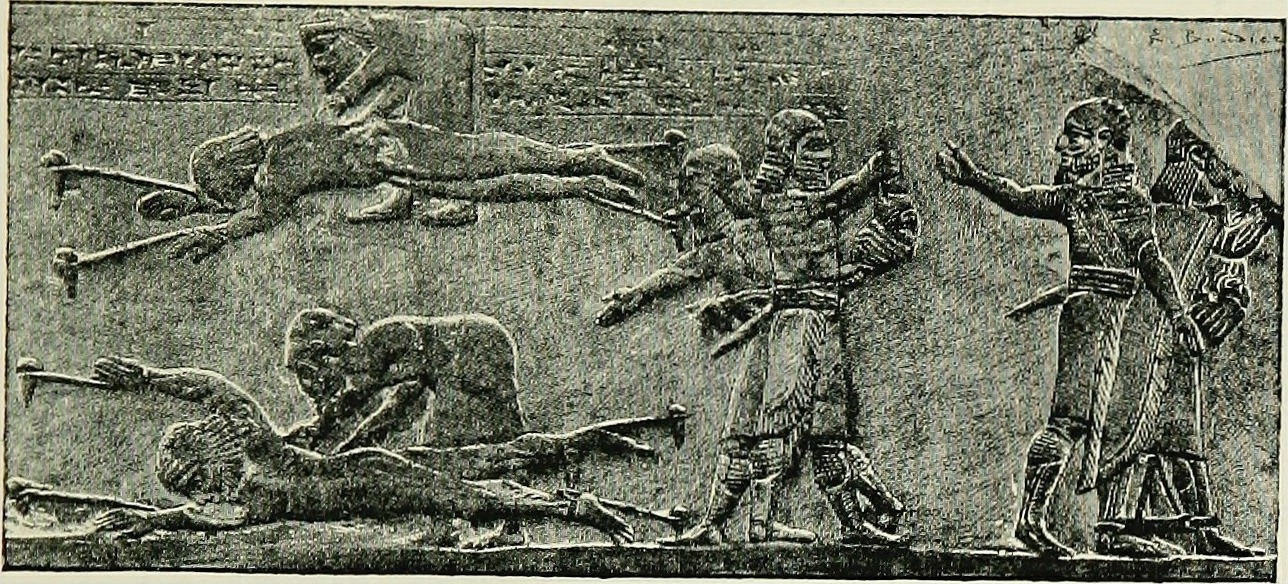
Two Elamite chiefs flayed alive after the battle during the crowning of Khumban-Igash.

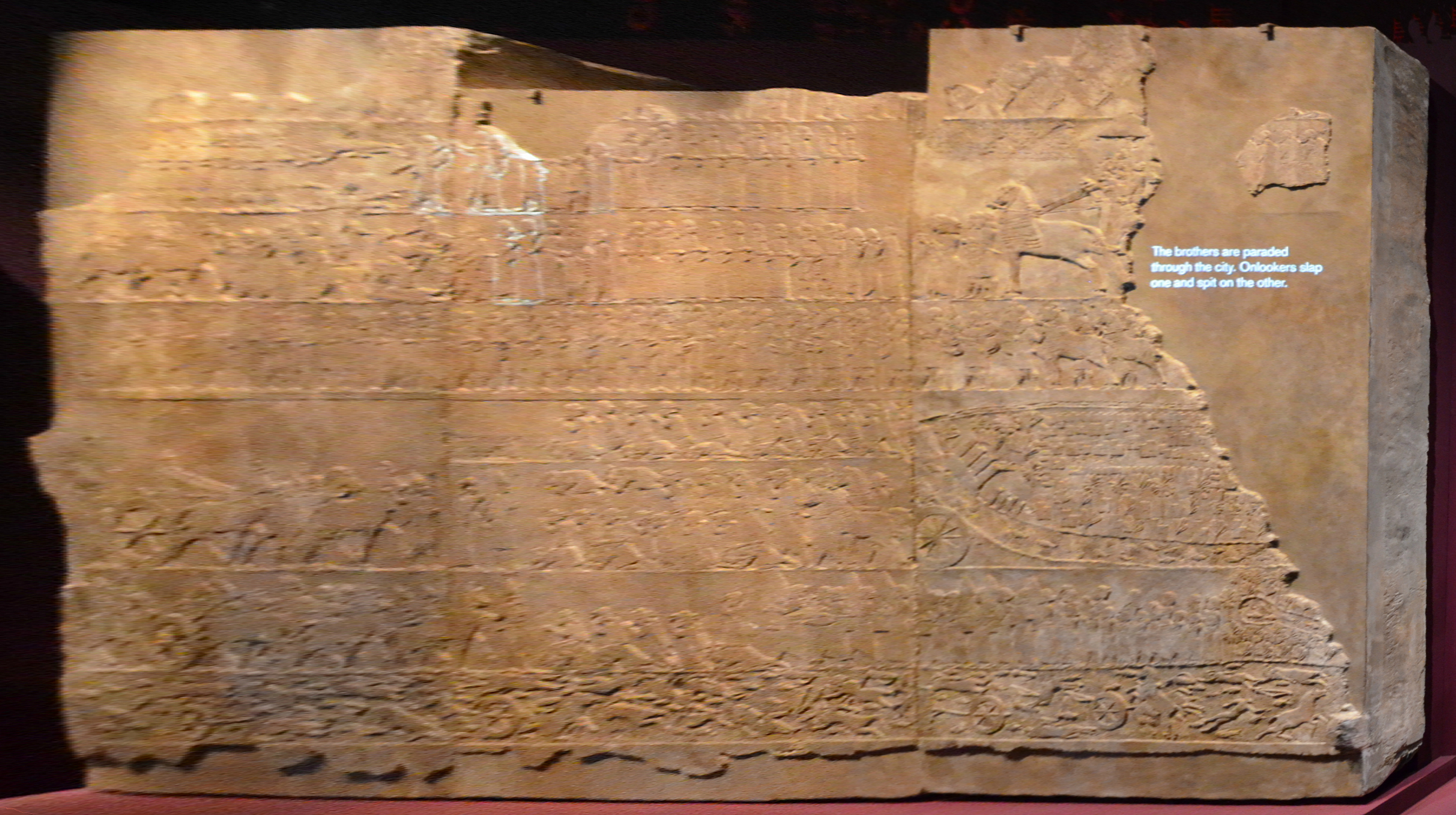
Aftermath of the battle of Ulai, with scenes of surrender and torture: the crowning of Khumban-Igash

== Sources ==
Georges Roux, Ancient Iraq
