= Urtak (king of Elam) =

Elamite king

Urtak or Urtaku was a king of the ancient kingdom of Elam, which was to the southeast of ancient Babylonia. He ruled from 675 to 664 BCE, his reign overlapping those of the Assyrian kings Esarhaddon (681–669) and Ashurbanipal (668–627).

Urtak was preceded by his brother, Khumban-Khaldash II. Khumban-Khaldash made a successful raid against Assyria, and died a short time thereafter. He was succeeded by Urtak, who returned to Assyria the idols his elder brother had taken in the raid, and who thereby repaired relations between Elam and Assyria.

He made an alliance with Assyria's Esarhaddon in 674, and for a time Elam and Assyria enjoyed friendly relations, which lasted throughout the remainder of Esarhaddon's reign, and deteriorated after Esarhaddon was succeeded by Ashurbanipal.

During a famine in Elam, Ashurbanipal welcomed temporary refugees from Elam into his empire, and sent food aid to Elam itself. However, after a time Urtak, joining his forces with the Gambulu tribe of Arameans, attacked Babylonia around 665 BCE, and died shortly afterward. Urtak was succeeded by his brother Teumman, who was killed by Ashurbanipal shortly afterward.

== See also ==
- List of Elamite kings
