= Achaemenid Civil War (522–520 BC) =

Achaemenid Civil War (522-520 BC)

Achaemenid Civil War (522-520 BC)
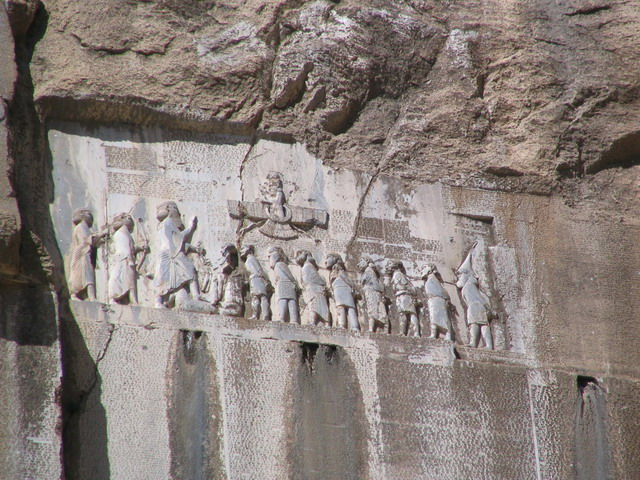
- The Behistun Inscription, carved into a cliffside, details the military actions of the civil war.
Date	522 BCE – 520 BCE
Location	Achaemenid Empire
Result	Victory for Darius

Belligerents
Achaemenid Empire (Darius' faction)	Achaemenid Empire (Bardiya or Gaumata)
	Rebelling provinces: Elam; Persis; Media; Assyria; Babylonia; Egypt; Parthia; Armenia; Margiana; Sattagydia; Sagartia; Hyrcania; Scythia

Commanders and leaders
Darius the Great; Hystaspes; Intaphrenes; Otanes; Gobryas; Hydarnes; Megabyzus; Aspathines; Dadarsi; Vahumisa; Takhmaspada; Artavardiya; Vivana	Bardiya or Gaumata; Patizeithes; Nebuchadnezzar III; Açina; Martiya; Phraortes; Tritantaechmes; Frada; Vahyazdata; Arakha; Atamaita

Strength
Unknown	Unknown

Casualties and losses
Unknown	Unknown

Between 522 and 520 BCE, a large scale civil war broke out within the Achaemenid Empire over the mysterious circumstances surrounding the death of Achaemenid King of Kings Bardiya and the ascension to the throne of Darius the Great.

== Bibliography ==
- Briant, Pierre (2002). From Cyrus to Alexander: A History of the Persian Empire. Eisenbrauns. pp. 1–1196. ISBN 978-1-57506-120-7.
