= Menostanes =

Nephew of Persian king Artaxerxes I (died 423 BC)

Menostanes (/məˈnɒstəniːz/; died 423 BC) was a Persian prince, son of Artarius, the satrap of Babylonia and thus nephew of king Artaxerxes I.

Around 445 BC he commanded the Persian army against the rebel satrap Megabyzus, but was defeated as was the previous commander, Usiris. A peace was signed c. 444 BC with Megabyzus after negotiations in which his father Artarius took part.

Artaxerxes I died in 423 BC and was succeeded by his son Xerxes II, who, 45 days later, was murdered by his half-brother Sogdianus, Menostanes and the eunuch Pharnacyas. Sogdianus became king and named Menostanes as his prime minister and chief of the army. However, Sogdianus was later defeated and put to death by Ochus, a brother of Xerxes II, who took the throne and changed his name to Darius II. Pharnacyas was stoned to death and Menostanes committed suicide.

Apart from Ctesias, there are no classical sources on Menostanes, but he appears to be mentioned in some cuneiform tablets of the Murashu family from the Babylonian city of Nippur, in which he is called Manuštånu. The Murashu Archive suggests that Menostanes owned large estates near Nippur. In 423 BC, Menostanes' domains passed to Artahšar, who has been identified with Artoxares, a supporter of Darius II.

== Classical references ==
- Ctesias, 41, 48, 49, 51

== Bibliography ==
- Dandamaev, M: A Political History of the Achaemenid Empire (1989).
- Donbaz, V., & Stolper, M.: "Gleanings from Muraßû Texts in the Collections of the Istanbul Archaeological Museums", in NABU 1993.
- Lendering, J.: "Megabyzus (2) ", in https://www.livius.org/
- Lendering, J.: "Xerxes II and Sogdianus ", in http://www.livius.org
