= Hydarnes =

6th-century BC Achaemenid Empire nobleman

Hydarnes (Old Persian: 𐎻𐎡𐎭𐎼𐎴, romanized: Vidṛna), also known as Hydarnes the Elder, was a Persian nobleman, who was one of the seven conspirators who overthrew the Pseudo-Smerdis. His name is the Greek transliteration of the Old Persian name Vidṛna, which may have meant "he who knows the guilt/wrong".

He was seemingly good friends with Aspathines, who invited him to join the conspiracy, which included the noblemen Intaphernes, Otanes, Gobryas, Megabyzus, and the Achaemenid prince Darius, who was its leader. For his services, Hydarnes was seemingly given the Achaemenid satrapy of Armenia as a semi-hereditary fief, since his descendants governed it until the Hellenistic period. Orontes I (died 344 BC), the ancestor of the Orontid dynasty, was descended from Hydarnes. According to some Persepolis tablets, Hydarnes served as the satrap of Media under Darius.

Hydarnes was survived by two sons, Hydarnes the Younger and Sisamnes, who both served as commanders under Darius's son and successor, Xerxes I (r. 486–465 BC).

== Sources ==
- Boyce, Mary; Grenet, Frantz (1991). Beck, Roger (ed.). A History of Zoroastrianism, Zoroastrianism under Macedonian and Roman Rule. Leiden: Brill. ISBN 978-9004293915.
- Briant, Pierre (2002). From Cyrus to Alexander: A History of the Persian Empire. Eisenbrauns. ISBN 978-1575060316.
- Schmitt, Rüdiger (2004). "Hydarnes". In Yarshater, Ehsan (ed.). Encyclopædia Iranica. Vol. XII/6: Human migration II–Illuminationism. London and New York: Routledge & Kegan Paul. pp. 588–590. ISBN 978-0-933273-80-1.
- Shahbazi, Shapur (1994), "Darius I the Great", Encyclopedia Iranica, vol. 7, New York: Columbia University, pp. 41–50
