= Arbarius =

5th-century BC Achaemenid general

Arbarius was a Persian general who played an important role during the succession crisis that occurred after the death of Artaxerxes I (424 BC). He is only mentioned by the Greek historian Ctesias of Cnidus and by some Babylonian documents.

When Artaxerxes died he was succeeded by his son and legitimate heir Xerxes II, but soon after he was assassinated by Sogdianus, one of his bastard brothers, who took the throne. Arbarius became commander of his cavalry. However, another illegitimate son of Artaxerxes, named Ochus, was recognized as ruler in Babylon from the very beginning. In addition, he soon received the support of Arsames, satrap of Egypt, and from the eunuch Artoxares. Arbarius, for his part, betrayed Sogdianus by switching to the side of Ochus. Sogdian was finally defeated and killed, and Ochus proclaimed himself king under the name of Darius II.

Arbarius (in Akkadian, Arbareme) is mentioned in the business records of the Murashu family of Nippur (Babylonia), as are a number of high-ranking personages of the time. In it is possible to observe that Arbareme was amply rewarded for his support of Darius II during the fratricidal war.

Ctesias also mentions a certain Artabarius in his account of the rebellion of Cyrus the Younger against his brother king Artaxerxes II (401 B.C.). This Artabarius, who could be identified with Arbarius, was executed for having planned to betray Artaxerxes and to join the side of Cyrus.
