= Zopyrus =

Persian nobleman (died 484/3 BC)

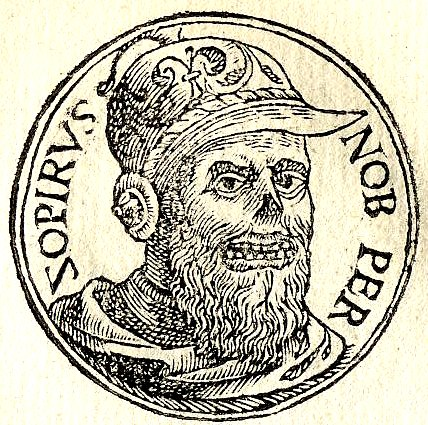
Zopyrus from Promptuarii Iconum Insigniorum

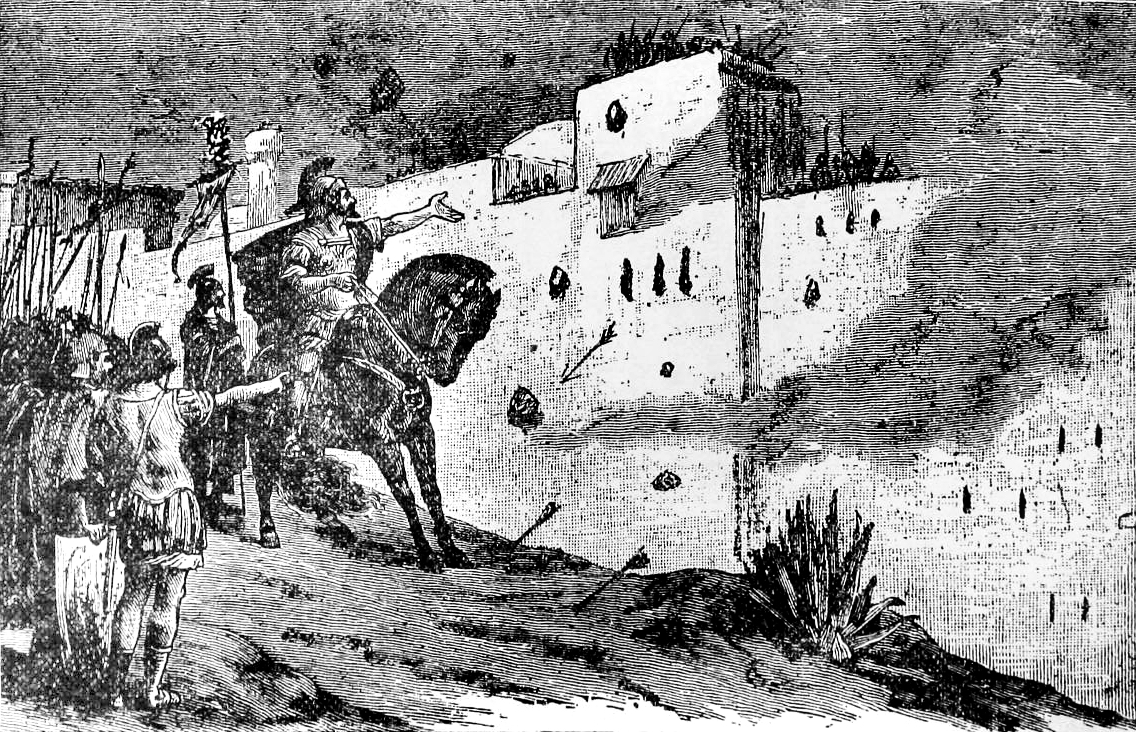
The Babylonians deriding Darius, before Zopyrus devised his stratagem

Zopyrus (/ˈzoʊpɪrəs/; Greek: Ζώπυρος) (died 484/3 BC) was a Persian nobleman mentioned in Herodotus' Histories.

He was son of Megabyzus I, who helped Darius I in his ascension. According to Herodotus, when Babylon revolted against the rule of Darius I, Zopyrus devised a plan to regain control of the vital city. By cutting off his own nose and ears, and then having himself whipped, he arrived at the court of Darius. Upon presenting himself to Darius, the king stood up from his throne, shocked at the state of Zopyrus, and asked who had done this to him. Zopyrus then said that he had mutilated himself. Darius asked "Are you fool enough to think that the mutilation of your body can hasten our victory? When you did that to yourself you must have taken leave of your senses." At this Zopyrus explained his plan, he would go before the people of Babylon and proclaim himself an exile and deserter of the Persian army punished by Darius himself. Seeing that the mutilation had already been done, Darius agreed and so Zopyrus put his plan into action. The Babylonian soldiers allowed him passage into the city and brought him before the chief princes of Babylon. The Babylonians, seeing a man of his high rank mutilated, took his contrived story as absolute fact. Gaining the Babylonians' trust, Zopyrus soon became commander-in-chief of their army, allowing him to weaken the city's defences. He then led soldiers under his charge into an ambush where Darius slaughtered them. The gates undefended, Darius' armies victoriously reconquered the city. Zopyrus was made satrap and Darius "rewarded him with the highest honours, giving him every year the sort of gifts which are most prized amongst the Persians".

The veracity of the account is debatable. First, the story resembles Homer's description of Odysseus, who spied on Troy after mutilating himself. Second, no cuneiform sources mention Zopyrus as satrap of Babylon.

According to the Persica by the Greek author Ctesias, Zopyrus was killed when the Babylonians revolted from king Xerxes. This happened in 484/483 BC.

Zopyrus was married to a sister of Darius; the couple had a son named Megabyzus, one of the Persian commanders during Xerxes' campaign against Greece (in 480 BC).
