= Tammaritu (son of Teumman) =

King of Elam from 664 to 653 BCE

- Prince of Elam
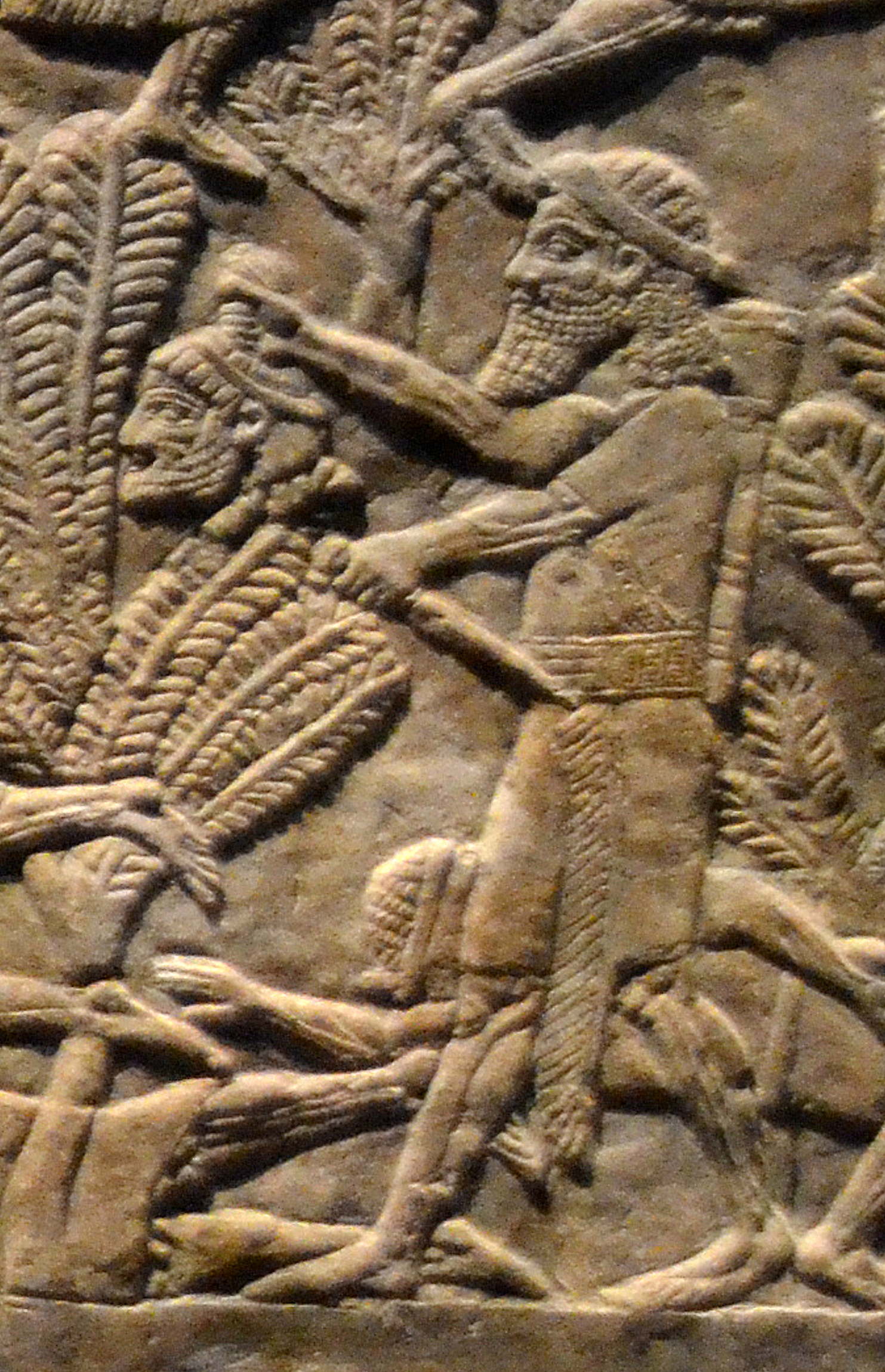
- Assyrian soldier holding the head of Tammaritu. British Museum.
- Dynasty: Humban-Tahrid dynasty ("Neo-Elamite")

Tammaritu (died in 653 BCE) was a prince of Elam and son of Teumman, king of the ancient kingdom of Elam, who ruled from 664 to 653 BCE, and was a contemporary with the Assyrian king Ashurbanipal (668 - c. 627 BCE). In various sources, the name may be found spelled as Te’umman, Teumann, or Te-Umman. For a time, "many scholars, beginning with G.G. Cameron," believed him to have been the Tepti-Huban-Inshushinak mentioned in inscriptions, although this view has since fallen from favor.

== Succession ==
Teumman succeeded Urtak. The relationship between Urtak and Teumman is a matter of disagreement. On the one hand, D. T. Potts (2015) refers to Teumann as "apparently unrelated to either Urtak or Hubanhaltash II." Likewise, Boederman's Cambridge Ancient History refers to the accession of Teumman as a "dynastic upset." On the other hand, M. Rahim Shayegan claims that "Te'umman seems to have been the brother of two of his royal predecessors (Huban-Haltaš II and Urtak)." In any event, upon the accession of Teumman, Urtak's sons escaped to Assyria, after which Urtak unsuccessfully demanded that Assyria return Urtak's sons to his custody.

== Battle of Ulai (653 BCE) ==
Ashurbanipal launched a devastating attack on Elam in 653. A text, written in 649, among the annals of Ashurbanipal, records Ashurbanipal's justifications for the war and its conclusion. Ashurbanipal's reasons for the war included "Teumman's insolent messages, his boasting, his evil plots, a lunar eclipse that foretold Teumman's downfall, a seizure inflicted on Teumman by the gods as a warning, and Teumman's declaration of war on Asshurbanipal." The text records that at the Battle of Ulai (653 BCE) Tammaritu defended his wounded father during the battle, but that he was ultimately beheaded together with his father. Teumman was replaced as king by Ummanigash.

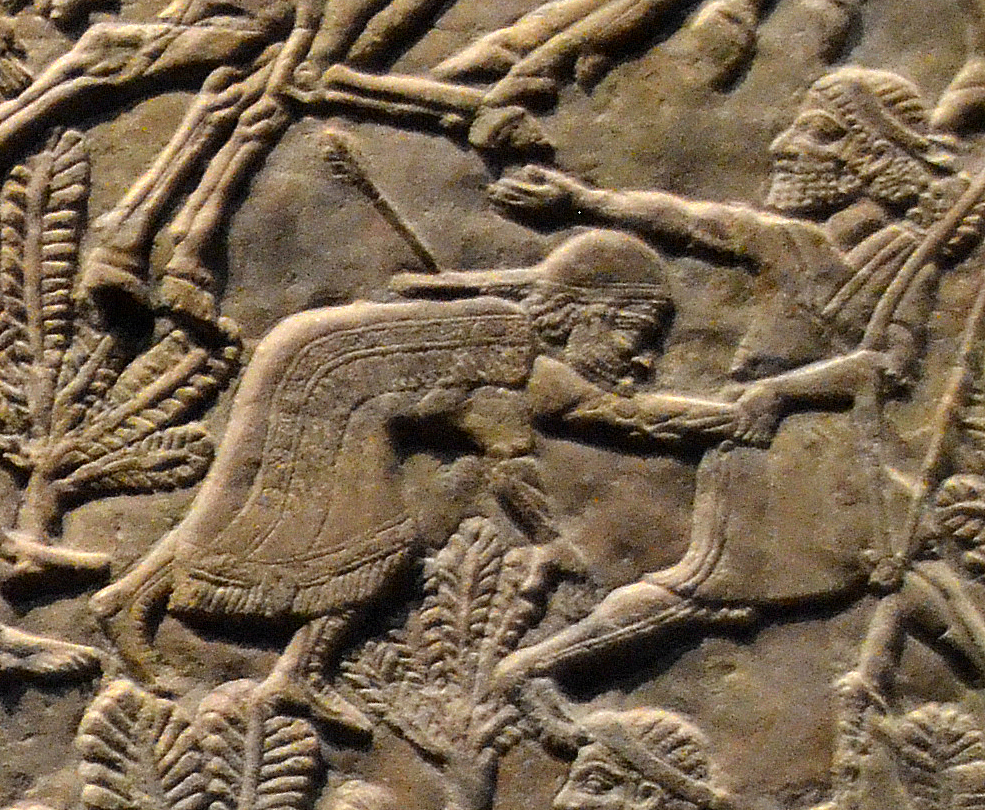
Teumman wounded and led by his son Tammaritu, trying to escape from the battlefield at Ulai.

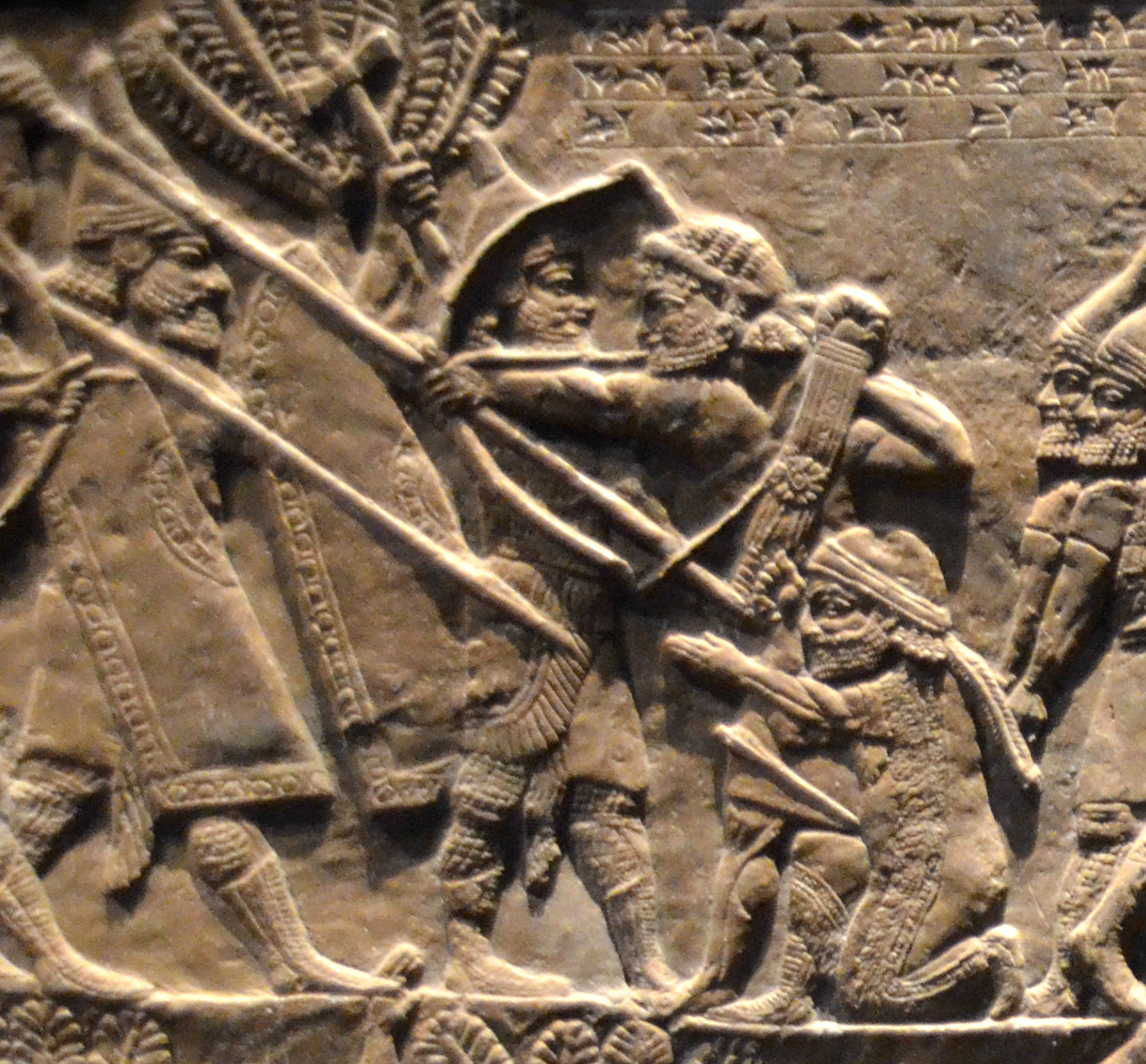
Last arrow of King Teuman and his son Tammaritu.

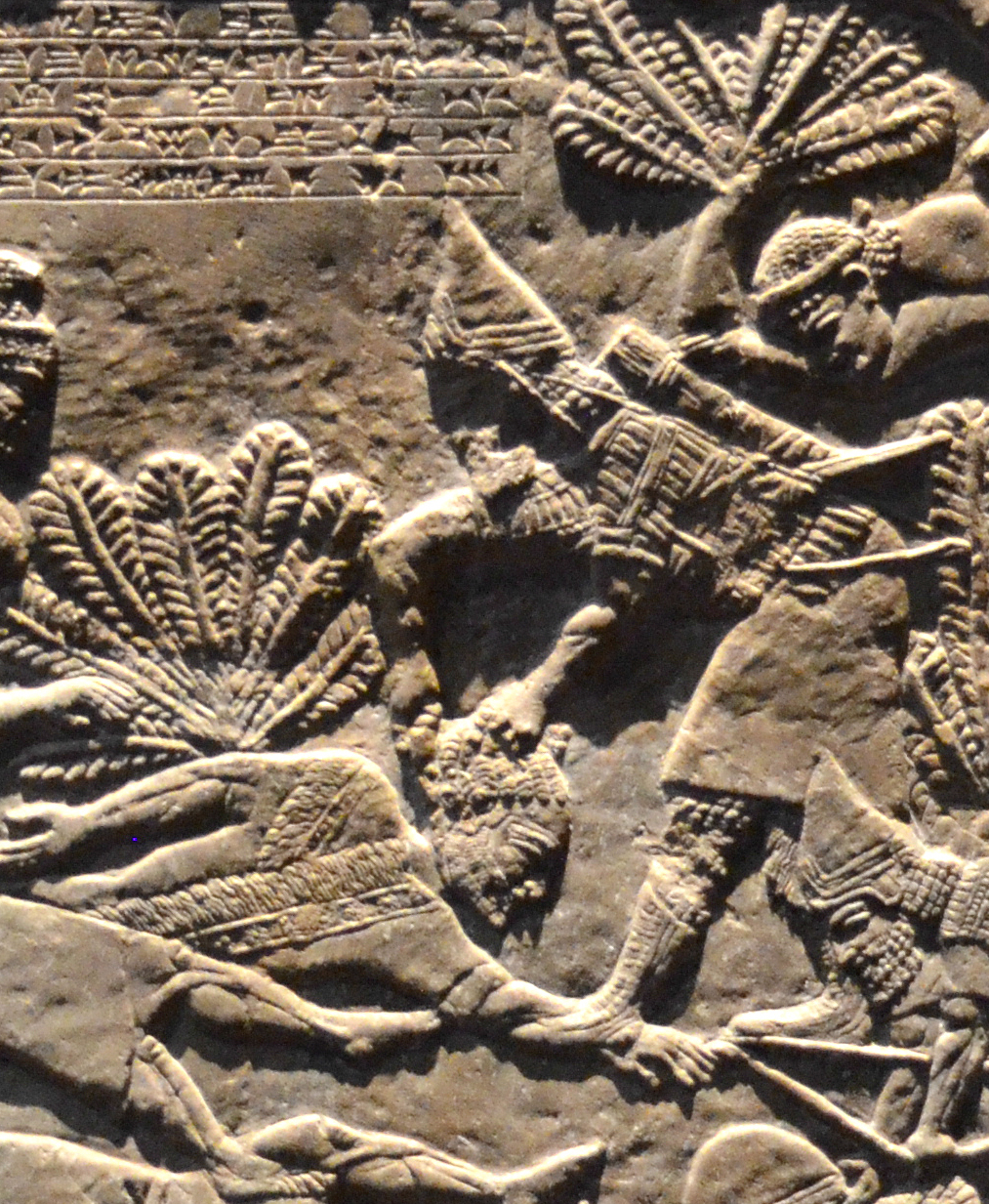
The beheading of King Teumman of Elam.

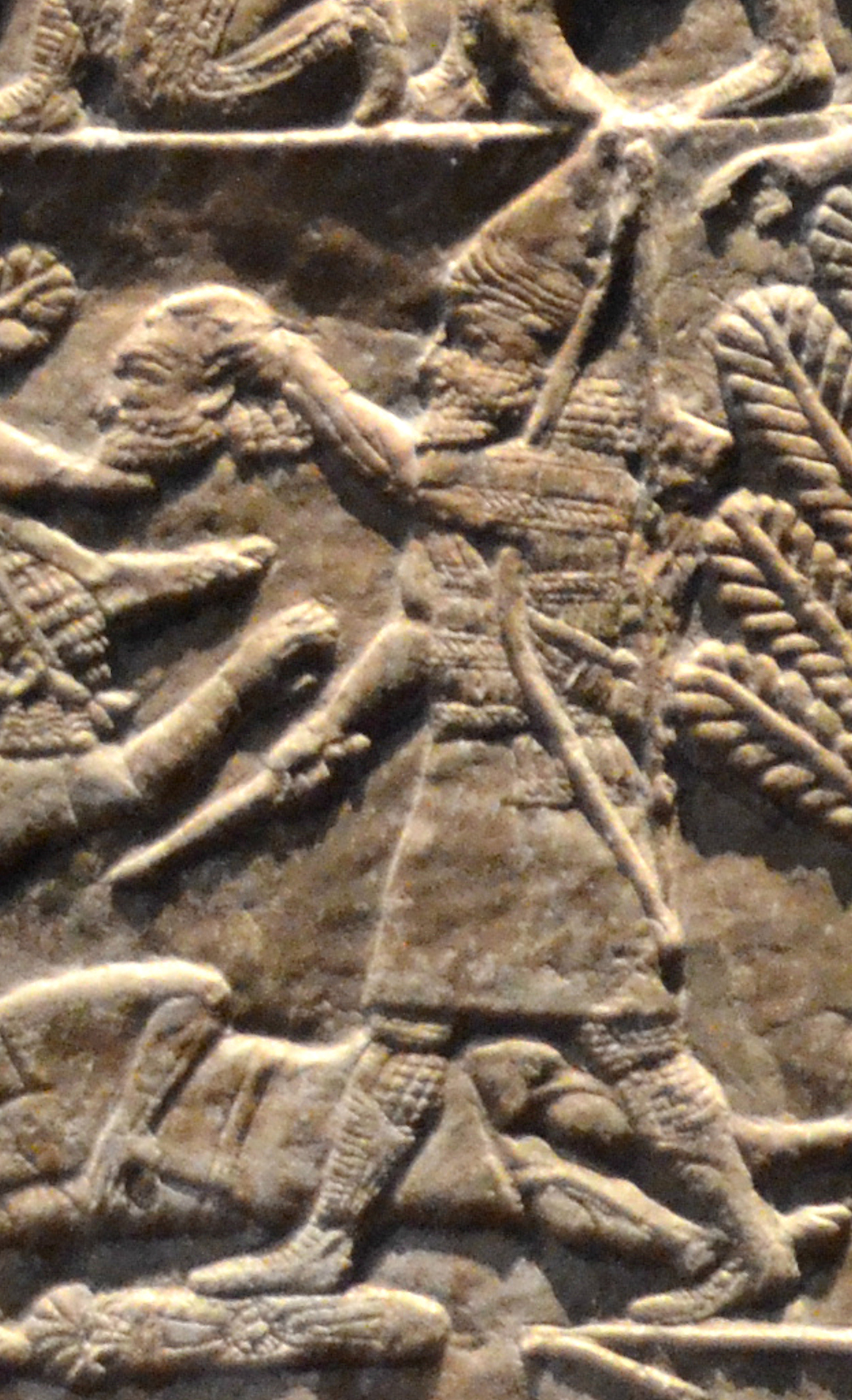
Assyrian warrior holding the head of Elamite King Teumman.

== See also ==
- List of rulers of Elam
