= Tomb of Darius II =

Tomb of Darius II آرامگاه داریوش دوم
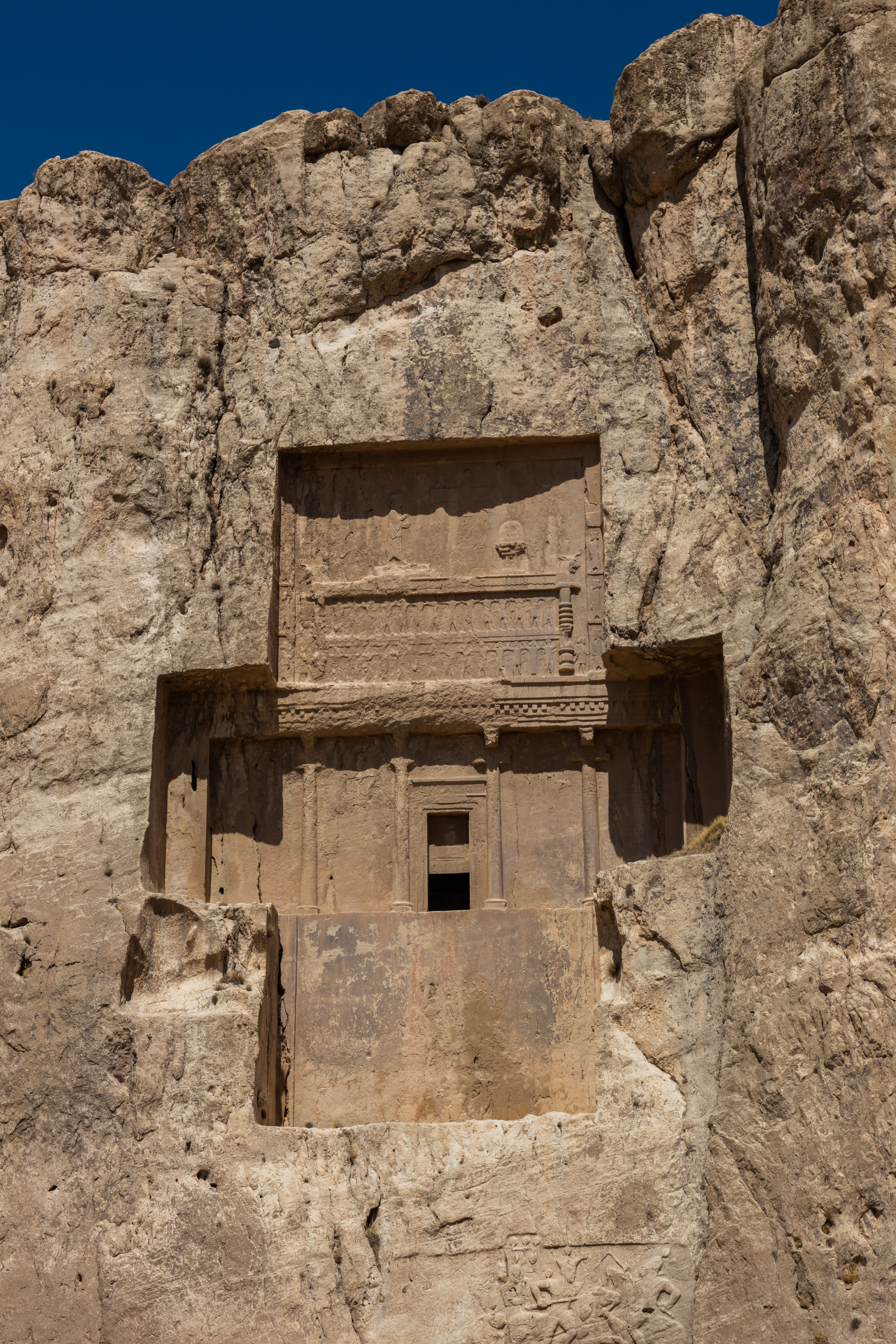
- Tomb of Darius II

- Location Pasargadae Iran
- Location: Marvdasht, Iran

History
- Built: Achaemenid Empire

Site notes
- Architectural styles: Persian architecture Achaemenid architecture

The Tomb of Darius II (Persian: آرامگاه داریوش دوم) are Catacomb located in Marvdasht.This tomb is part of the Naqsh-e Rostam.

== Gallery ==
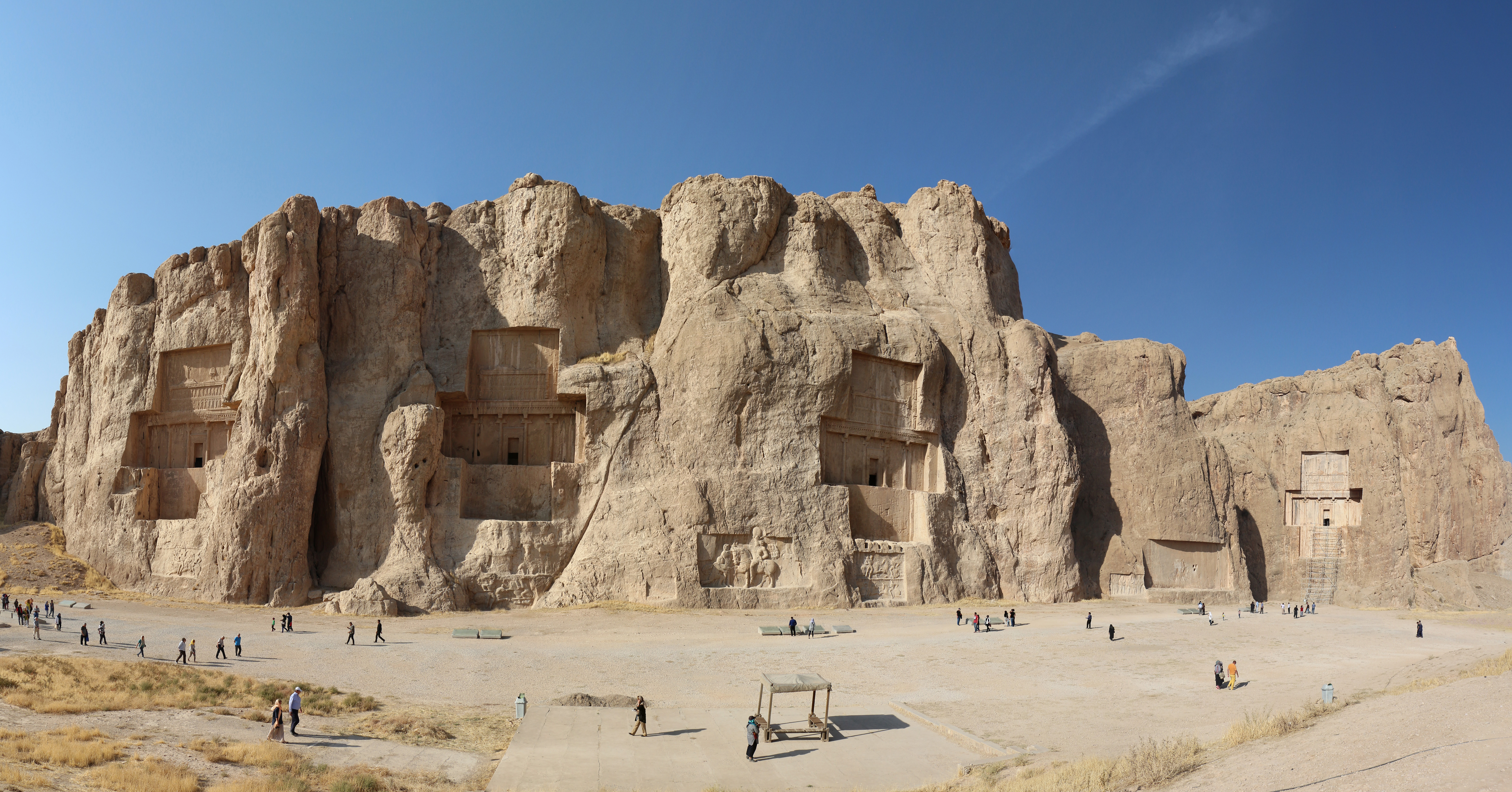

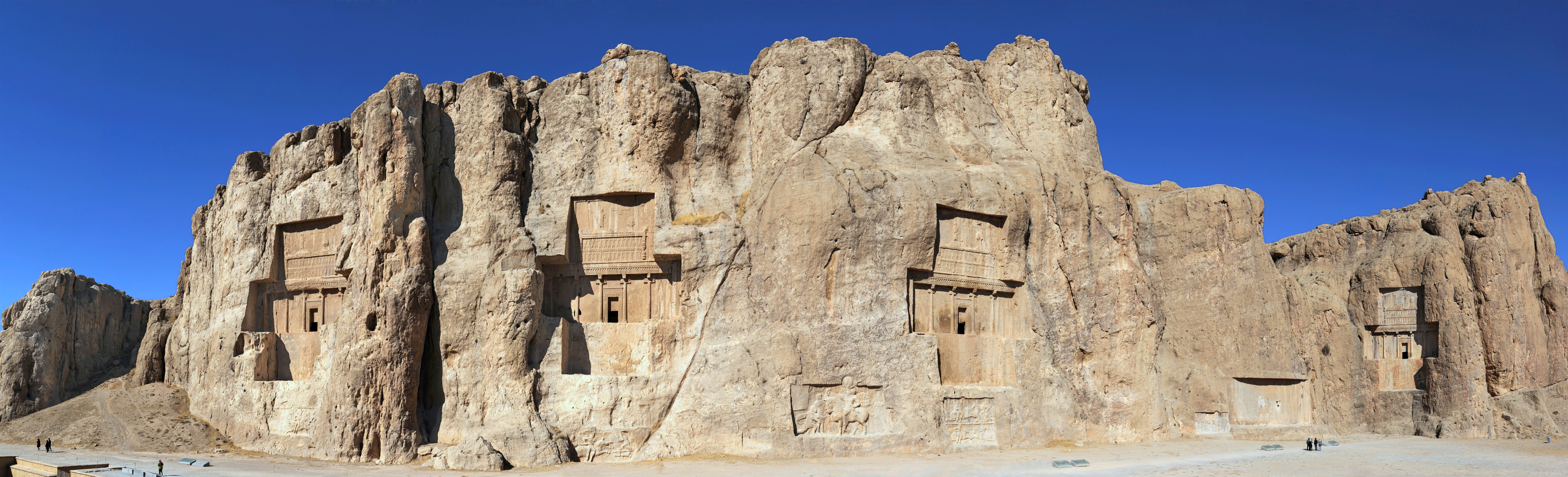

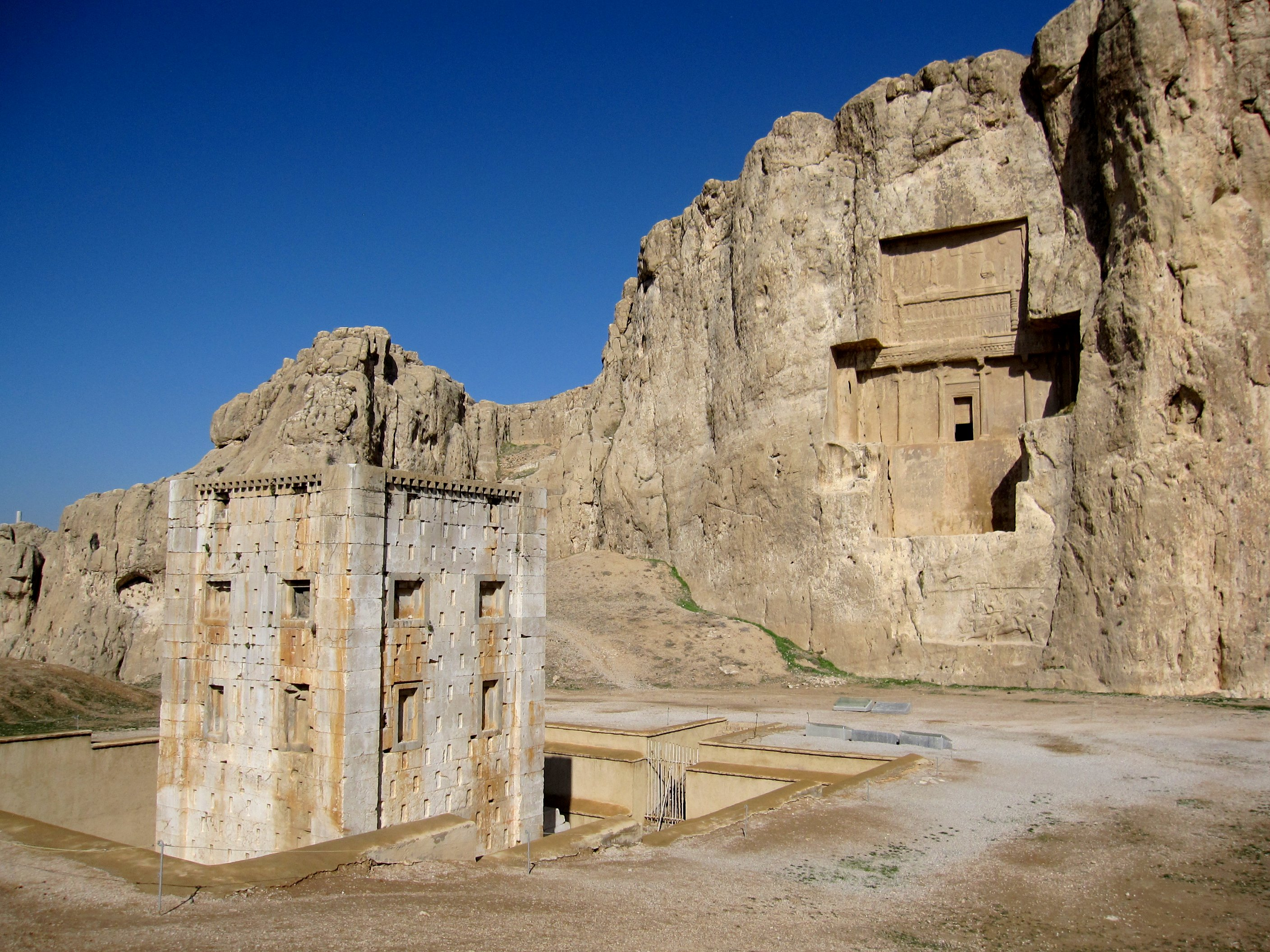

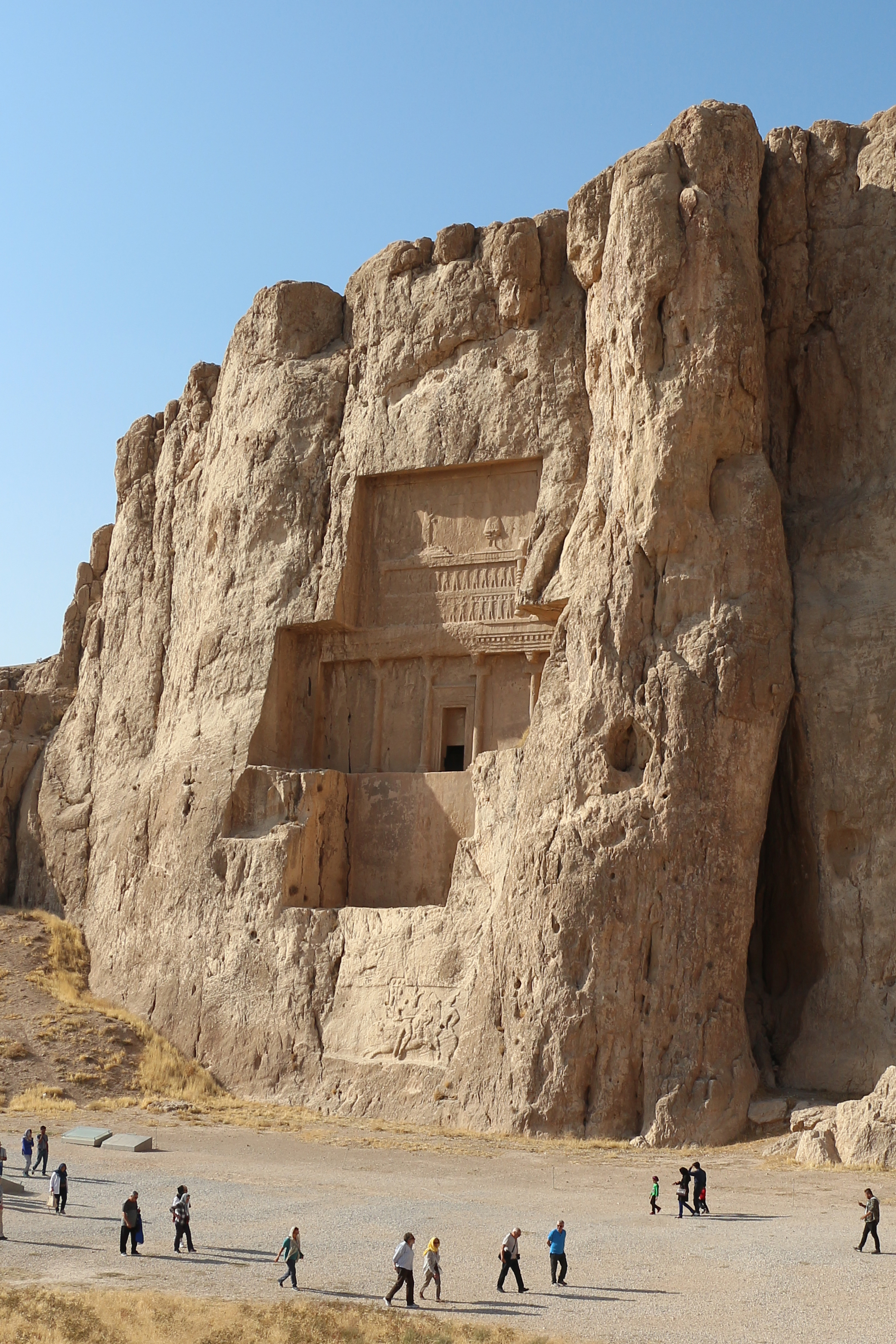
