= Seven Achaemenid clans =

Key families during Persian Achaemenid era

Seven Achaemenid clans or seven Achaemenid houses were seven significant families that had key roles during the Achaemenid era. Only one of them had regnant pedigree.

== Nobles of the seven clans ==
According to Herodotus, after the departure of Cambyses II for Egypt, the usurper Gaumata impersonated Bardiya (Smerdis), the younger brother of Cambyses, and became king. A group of seven Persian noblemen became suspicious of the false king and conspired to overthrow Gaumata. After the death of Gaumata, in a negotiation to determine the form of government, Otanes (Hutan) recommended a democratic government but his offer was not adopted and monarchy continued in Iran.

The names of them were mentioned in Herodotus' Histories and the Behistun Inscription:

1. Otanes
2. Ardumanish (possibly the same as Aspathines)
3. Gobryas, father of Mardonius
4. Intaphrenes
5. Megabyzus I
6. Hydarnes
7. Darius I

Arthur Emanuel Christensen, a Danish historian and Iranologist, contends that Herodotus was mistaken to say that the prominence of these nobles and their successors was due to participation in murder of Gaumata; he further states that the institution of the "Seven Noble Clans" continued as late as the Parthian Empire.

== See also ==
- Seven Parthian clans
