= Megabyzus =

5th-century BC Achaemenid Persian general

- Spouse: Amytis
- Children: Zopyrus II
- Military career
- Allegiance: Achaemenid Empire
- Service years: fl. c. 485 – 440 BCE
- Rank: General, satrap of Syria
- Conflicts: Egyptian campaign

Megabyzus (Ancient Greek: Μεγάβυζος, from Old Persian: 𐎲𐎥𐎲𐎢𐎧𐏁, romanized: Bagabuxšaʰ) was an Achaemenid Persian general, son of Zopyrus, satrap of Babylonia, and grandson of Megabyzus I, one of the seven conspirators who had put Darius I on the throne. His father was killed when the satrapy rebelled in 484 BCE, and Megabyzus led the forces that recaptured the city, after which the statue of the god Marduk was destroyed to prevent future revolts. Megabyzus subsequently took part in the Second Persian invasion of Greece (480–479 BCE). Herodotus claims that he refused to act on orders to pillage Delphi, but it is doubtful such orders were ever given.

== Conspiracy of Artabanes ==
Ctesias describes how Amytis, wife of Megabyzus and daughter of Xerxes, was accused of adultery. As such, Megabyzus took part in the conspiracy of Artabanus to assassinate the emperor, but betrayed him before he could kill the new emperor Artaxerxes, as well. In a battle, Artabanus' sons were killed and Megabyzus was wounded, but Amytis interceded on his behalf and he was cured.

== Egyptian campaign ==
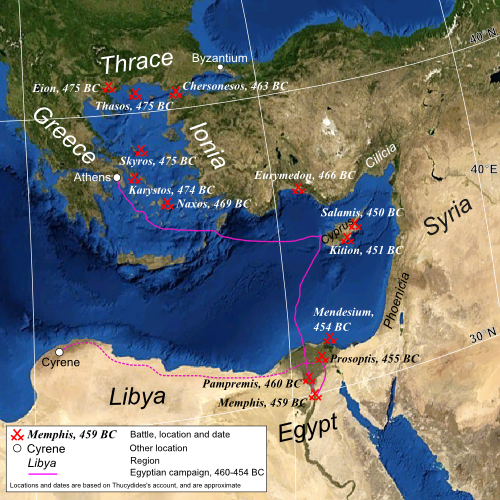
Megabyzus fought against the Athenians and the Egyptians in the siege of Memphis (459–455 BCE) and the siege of Prosopitis (455 BCE).

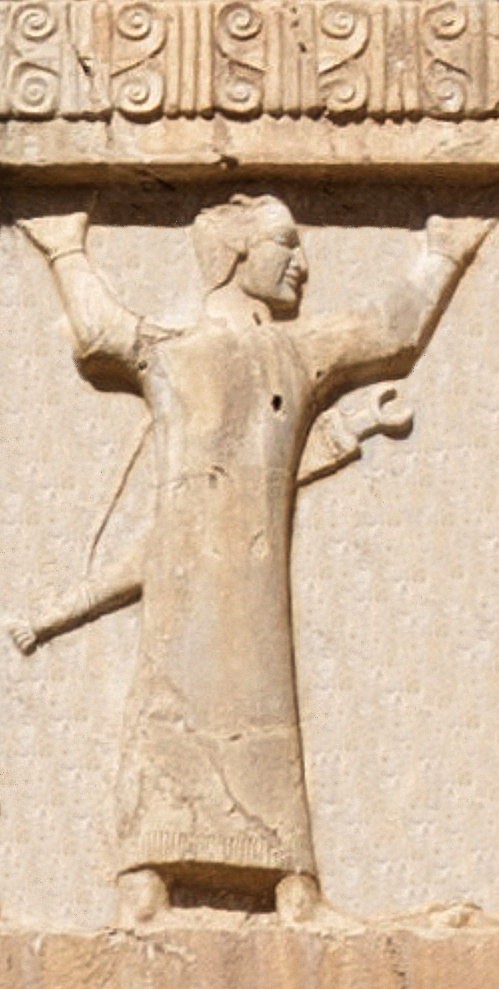
Egyptian soldier, circa 470 BCE – Xerxes I tomb relief

After this Megabyzus became satrap of Syria. Together with Artabazus, satrap of Phrygia, he had command of the Persian armies sent to put down the revolt of Inarus in Egypt. They arrived in 456 BCE, and within two years had put down the revolt, capturing Inarus and various Athenians supporting him.

=== Origin of the Egyptian campaign ===
When Xerxes I was assassinated in 465 BCE, he was succeeded by his son Artaxerxes I, but several parts of the Achaemenid empire soon revolted, foremost of which were Bactria and Egypt. The Egyptian Inarus defeated the Persian satrap of Egypt Achaemenes, a brother of Artaxerxes, and took control of Lower Egypt. He contacted the Greeks, who were also officially still at war with Persia, and in 460 BCE, Athens sent an expeditionary force of 200 ships and 6000 heavy infantry to support Inarus. The Egyptian and Athenian troops defeated the local Persian troops of Egypt, and captured the city of Memphis, except for the Persian citadel which they besieged for several years.

=== Siege of Memphis (459–455 BCE) ===
The Athenians and Egyptians had settled down to besiege the local Persian troops in Egypt, at the White Castle. The siege evidently did not progress well, and probably lasted for at least four years, since Thucydides says that their whole expedition lasted 6 years, and of this time the final 18 months was occupied with the siege of Prosoptis.

According to Thucydides, at first Artaxerxes sent Megabazus to try and bribe the Spartans into invading Attica, to draw off the Athenian forces from Egypt. When this failed, he instead assembled a large army under Megabyzus, and dispatched it to Egypt. Diodorus has more or less the same story, with more detail; after the attempt at bribery failed, Artaxerxes put Megabyzus and Artabazus in charge of 300,000 men, with instructions to quell the revolt. They went first from Persia to Cilicia and gathered a fleet of 300 triremes from the Cilicians, Phoenicians and Cypriots, and spent a year training their men. Then they finally headed to Egypt. Modern estimates, however, place the number of Persian troops at the considerably lower figure of 25,000 men given that it would have been highly impractical to deprive the already strained satrapies of any more man power than that. Thucydides does not mention Artabazus, who is reported by Herodotus to have taken part in the second Persian invasion; Diodorus may be mistaken about his presence in this campaign. It is clearly possible that the Persian forces did spend some prolonged time in training, since it took four years for them to respond to the Egyptian victory at Papremis. Although neither author gives many details, it is clear that when Megabyzus finally arrived in Egypt, he was able to quickly lift the siege of Memphis, defeating the Egyptians in battle, and driving the Athenians from Memphis.

=== Siege of Prosopitis (455 BCE) ===
The Athenians now fell back to the island of Prosopitis in the Nile delta, where their ships were moored. There, Megabyzus laid siege to them for 18 months, until finally he was able to drain the river from around the island by digging canals, thus "joining the island to the mainland". In Thucydides's account the Persians then crossed over to the former island, and captured it. Only a few of the Athenian force, marching through Libya to Cyrene survived to return to Athens. In Diodorus's version, however, the draining of the river prompted the Egyptians (whom Thucydides does not mention) to defect and surrender to the Persians. The Persians, not wanting to sustain heavy casualties in attacking the Athenians, instead allowed them to depart freely to Cyrene, whence they returned to Athens. Since the defeat of the Egyptian expedition caused a genuine panic in Athens, including the relocation of the Delian treasury to Athens, Thucydides's version is probably more likely to be correct.

== Cyprus campaign ==
They then turned their attention to Cyprus, which was under attack by the Athenians, led by Cimon. Shortly afterwards, hostilities between Persia and Athens ceased, called the peace of Callias.

== Revolt ==
Some time later, Megabyzus himself revolted. Ctesias explains that the reason was that Amestris had the captives from the Egyptian revolt executed, though Megabyzus had given his word that they would not be harmed.

Armies under Usiris of Egypt and the prince Menostanes, a nephew of the king, were sent against him, both forgoing battle for (non-fatal) duels between the generals, and in both cases Megabyzus was victorious. The king resolved to send his brother Artarius, the eunuch Artoxares and Amytis in a peace embassy. His honour restored, Megabyzus agreed to surrender and was pardoned, retaining his position. Some time later, Megabyzus saved Artaxerxes from a lion in a hunt and was subsequently exiled to Cyrtae for violating the royal prerogative to make the first kill, but he returned to Susa by pretending to be a leper and was pardoned.

Megabyzus died shortly afterwards, at age 76. His son, Zopyrus II, was known to have lived as an exile in Athens, and aided in its assault on Caunus during his father's exile, where he was killed by a rock.

== See also ==
- Megabazus
- Megabates
