= Artoxares =

5th-century BC Paphlagonian eunuch and Achaemenid official

Artoxares (/ˌɑːrtəˈzɛriːz/; Old Persian *Artaxšara) (c. 465 BC - after 419 BC) was a Paphlagonian eunuch, who played a central role during the reigns of Artaxerxes I and Darius II of Persia.

According to Ctesias, when he was twenty years old, Artoxares participated in an embassy to the rebel satrap Megabyzus. King Artaxerxes I and the rebel satrap reconciled in around 445 BC. Nevertheless, Megabyzus fell again into disgrace and was exiled to a Persian Gulf town. Artoxares, who had helped Megabyzus to gain the favour of the Persian king, was expelled from the court to Armenia. It has been argued that he actually was appointed as satrap of Armenia, but this is not explicitly stated by Ctesias.

When Artaxerxes died (424 BC), his sons Xerxes II, Sogdianus and Darius II Ochus started a civil war against each other. Arbarius, a cavalry commander, Arsames, the satrap of Egypt and Artoxares all decided to follow Darius. When Darius defeated his brothers, Artoxares became one of the most powerful members of the court. Nevertheless, after a short time he plotted against the new king and was executed on the orders of queen Parysatis. Artoxares' plot took place just after the revolts of Arsites and Artyphius, and of the satrap Pissuthnes. While plotting he attempted to acquire an artificial beard, being unable to grow one himself, for the purpose of creating a suitable impression.

From the Murashu family archives from Nippur, we know a certain Artahshar (Artahŝar), who has been identified with the Artoxares of the classical sources. According to this archives, the domains of Manuštånu (identified with Menostanes, a follower of Sogdianus) passed to Artahŝar after Darius' coronation.

Artoxares could have inspired the Greek playwright Aristophanes for the Plaphagonian character in his play The Knights.
