= Darius II =

King of Kings of the Achaemenid Empire from 423 to 405/4 BC

Darius II 𐎭𐎠𐎼𐎹𐎺𐎢𐏁
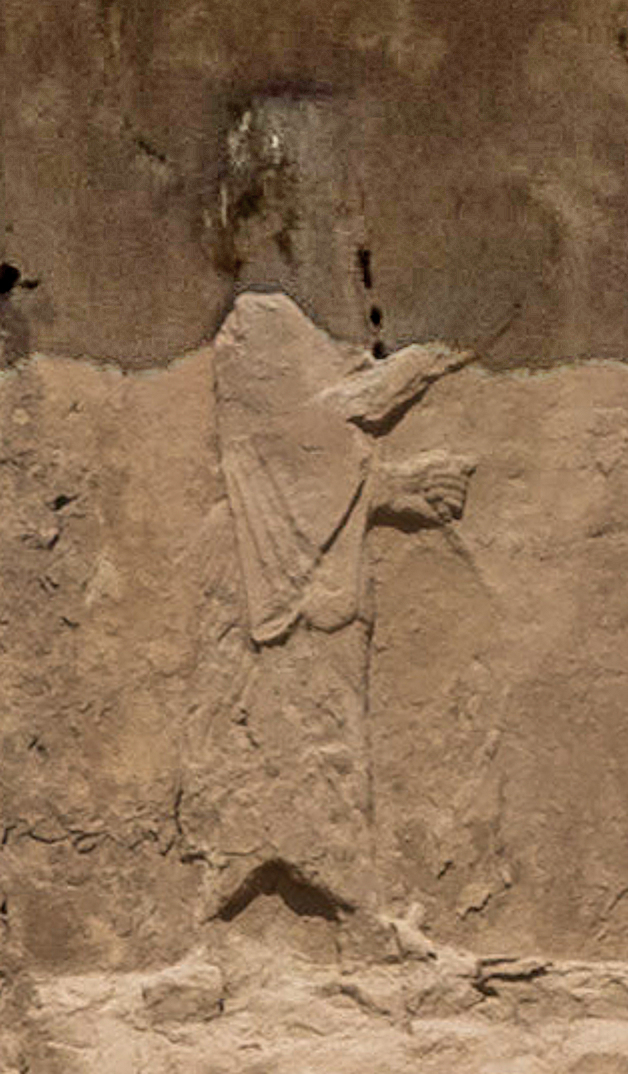
- Darius II as depicted on his tomb in Naqsh-e Rostam

King of Kings of the Achaemenid Empire
- Reign: 423–404 BC
- Predecessor: Sogdianus
- Successor: Artaxerxes II

Pharaoh of Egypt
- Reign: 423–404 BC
- Predecessor: Sogdianus
- Successor: Amyrtaeus
- Died: 404 BC
- Spouse: Parysatis
- Issue: Artaxerxes II; Cyrus the Younger; Ostanes
- Dynasty: Achaemenid
- Father: Artaxerxes I
- Mother: Cosmartidene of Babylon
Religion
Ancient Iranian religion
Darius II
- Military career
- Conflicts: Conflicts: Wars of Darius II; Lydian Revolt of Pissuthnes (420-415bc)

Darius II (Old Persian: 𐎭𐎠𐎼𐎹𐎺𐎢𐏁 Dārayavaʰuš; Ancient Greek: Δαρεῖος Dareios), also known by his given name Ochus (Greek: Ὦχος Ochos), was King of Kings of the Achaemenid Empire from 423 BC to 405 or 404 BC.

Following the death of Artaxerxes I, in 424 BC or 423 BC, there was a struggle for power between his sons. The victor, Ochus, adopted the name Darius (Greek sources often call him Darius Nothos, "Bastard"), in reference to his unattested lineage. His reign was marked by a series of revolts by various satraps and involvement in the Greek Peloponnesian War. It seems that Darius II was quite dependent on his wife Parysatis. In excerpts from Ctesias, some harem intrigues are recorded, in which he played a disreputable part. The Elephantine papyri mention Darius II as a contemporary of the high priest Johanan of Ezra 6:10. Darius II is potentially mentioned in the books of Haggai, Zechariah, and Ezra–Nehemiah of the Hebrew Bible (the Christian Old Testament). There is some debate on whether these books refer to Darius the Great though.

== Rise to power ==
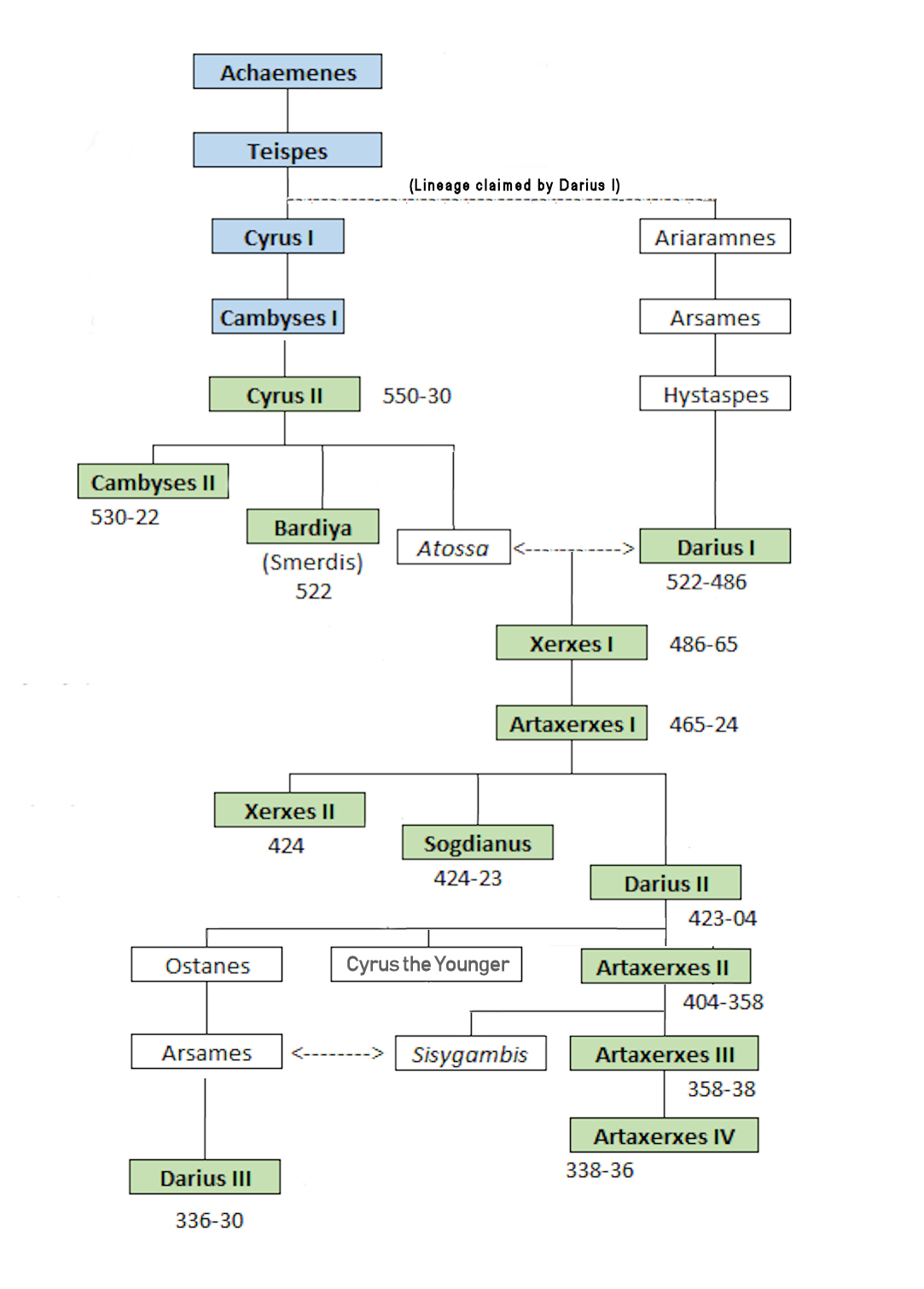
Location of Darius II in the Achaemenid family tree.

Texts from the Babylonian Murashu Archive date the transition from Artaxerxes I to Darius II between December 424 BC and February 423 BC. These Babylonian records do not reference any other contenders for the Persian throne directly, but Classical Greek and Latin historians, primarily Ctesias of Cnidus, describe a struggle for power within the Achamenid royal family. Darius II received his royal name and recognition from supporters in Babylon, while his half-brothers, Xerxes II and Sogdianus, claimed authority elsewhere in the Empire. After just 45 days, Sogdianus orchestrated Xerxes's assassination.

Darius quickly gathered support from influential figures in the Persian Empire, including Sogdianus’s former cavalry commander, Arbarius, Satrap Arsames of Egypt, the influential Paphlagonian eunuch Artoxares, and possibly Satrap Hydarnes of Armenia. Rather than fighting Sogdianus, Darius and his wife and half-sister, Parysatis, arranged to negotiate. When Sogdianus arrived for negotiations, he was seized and executed in a pit of hot ashes.

Soon after defeating his half-brothers, Darius’s full brother, Arsites, rebelled for unclear reasons. Arsites was Satrap of Syria and had the support of Artyphius, son of the earlier rebel Satrap Megabyzus. Darius sent an army to confront his brother under the command of Artasyrus, a Bactrian nobleman. The rebels defeated Artasyrus' army in two engagements, but they were defeated in a third. After that defeat, Artasyrus bribed the Greek mercenaries in Arsites's army to surrender and captured Artyphius. Artyphius was temporarily spared on Parysatis’ advice to demonstrate the new regime’s leniency. When Arsites surrendered, he and Artyphius were both executed with hot ashes as well.

== Internal rebellions ==
Early in Darius’s reign, Pissuthnes, the Satrap of Lydia, also staged a revolt for unknown reasons. Pissuthnes employed the Athenian general Lycon to command Greek mercenaries on his behalf while Darius sent Tissaphernes, a younger son of Hydarnes, to combat the rebellion. Tissaphernes immediately sent a letter to Lycon, offering the Greek mercenaries greater rewards if they turned on Pissouthnes and joined Tissaphernes’ army. The rebellious satrap was forced to negotiate and surrender. Tissaphernes sent him back to Persia to face execution and became the new Satrap of Lydia as a reward.

Pissuthnes' son, Amorges, continued the rebellion with a band of mercenaries funded by Athens in Iasus. Darius may have been hesitant to pursue Amorges in order to avoid conflict with Athens, but after the disastrous Athenian expedition to Sicily, the king ordered Tissaphernes and the neighboring satrap, Pharnabazus II, to defeat the rebels and exact tribute from Athenian-held territory in Asia Minor. Tissaphernes arranged an alliance with Sparta, and the Spartan navy assisted the Persians in defeating Amorges and re-taking Iasus in 412 BC.

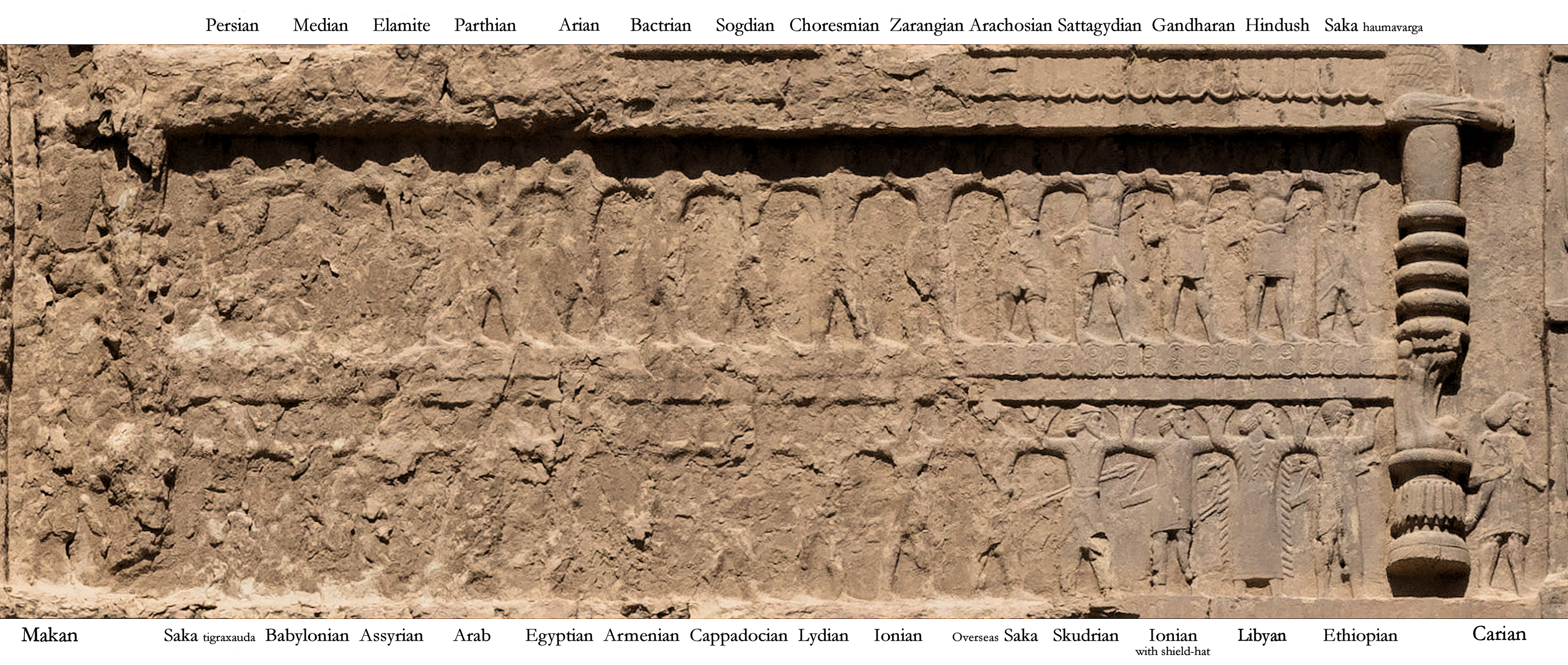
Soldiers of the Empire, on the tomb of Darius II.

After Darius took power, he arranged diplomatic marriages between his own family and that of Hydarnes in Armenia. Darius’s eldest son, Arsaces (the future Artaxerxes II), married Hydarnes's daughter, Stateira. Hydarnes’ son, Terituchmes, married Darius’s daughter, Amestris. When Hydarnes died, Terituchmes inherited his position as Satrap of Armenia but came to resent his royal marriage. According to Ctesias, the new Satrap was in love with his own sister, Rhoxane and made plans to murder Amestris and marry Rhoxane instead.

Terituchmes gathered 300 men to stuff Amestris in a sack and stab her to death. Murdering a member of the royal family was an act of rebellion, but before Darius could mobilize against Armenia, an Armenian nobleman, Udiastes, offered to raise an army and put down the rebellion himself, killing Terituchmes and 37 of his assassins in the resulting battle. Udiastes's own son was one of the rebels and attempted to flee with one of Terituchmes's sons to Zaris, but they were soon captured and executed as well. Armenia was temporarily governed by Artasyrus as a “King’s Eye,” before passing the province to his son, Orontes I.

Xenophon and Diodorus Siculus reference several other minor revolts in their works, including conflict with the Medes, Cadusians, Pisidians, Arabs, and Egyptians.

== Conflict with Athens ==
As long as the power of Athens remained intact Darius did not meddle in Greek affairs. In 424 or 423 BC, Darius and the Athenian emissary Epilycus confirmed the peace between Persia and Athens, either through a new agreement or a renewal of the Peace of Callias. When in 413 BC, Athens supported the rebel Amorges in Caria, Darius II would not have responded had not the Athenian power been broken in the same year at Syracuse. As a result of that event, Darius II gave orders to his satraps in Asia Minor, Tissaphernes and Pharnabazus, to send in the overdue tribute of the Greek towns and to begin a war with Athens. To support the war with Athens, the Persian satraps entered into an alliance with Sparta. In 408 BC he sent his son Cyrus to Asia Minor, to carry on the war with greater energy.

Darius II may have expelled various Greek dynasts who had been ruling cities in Ionia: Pausanias wrote that the sons of Themistocles, which include Archeptolis, Governor of Magnesia, "appear to have returned to Athens", and that they dedicated a painting of Themistocles in the Parthenon and erected a bronze statue to Artemis Leucophryene, the goddess of Magnesia, on the Acropolis. They may have returned from Asia Minor in old age, after 412 BC, when the Achaemenids took again firm control of the Greek cities of Asia, and they may have been expelled by the Achaemenid satrap Tissaphernes sometime between 412 and 399 BC. In effect, from 414 BC, Darius II had started to resent increasing Athenian power in the Aegean and had Tissaphernes enter into an alliance with Sparta against Athens, which in 412 BC led to the Persian conquest of the greater part of Ionia.

Darius is said to have received the visit of Greek athlete and Olympic champion Polydamas of Skotoussa, who made a demonstration of his strength by killing three Immortals in front of the Persian ruler. A sculpture representing the scene is visible in the Museum of the History of the Olympic Games of antiquity.

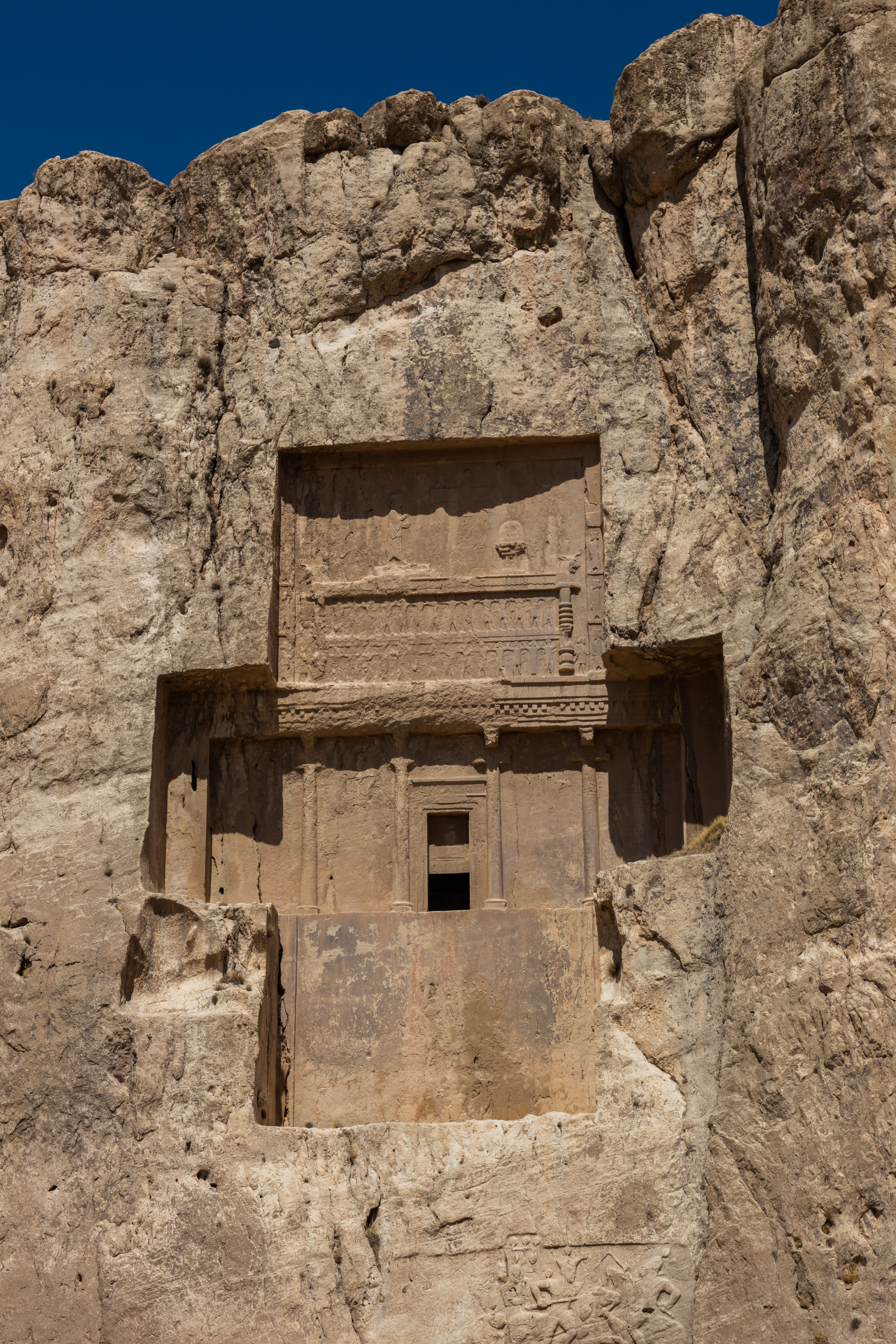
Prospective Tomb of Darius II in Naqsh-e Rostam

Darius II died in 404 BC, in the nineteenth year of his reign, and was followed as Persian king by Artaxerxes II.

== Children ==
Born of Parysatis
Amestris the wife of Terituchmes
Artaxerxes II
Cyrus the Younger
Artostes
Ostanes
Oxathres or Oxendares or Oxendras
Seven other unnamed children died in childhood

With an unknown mother
The unnamed satrap of Media at 401 B.C.

== See also ==
- Artoxares
- Kay Darab

Darius II Achaemenid dynasty Died: 404 BC
Preceded by ?	Satrap of Hyrcania ???–423 BC	Succeeded by ?
Preceded by Sogdianus	King of Kings of Persia; 423–404 BC	Succeeded by Artaxerxes II
Preceded by Sogdianus	Pharaoh of Egypt; XXVII Dynasty; 423–404 BC	Succeeded by Amyrtaeus
