= Açina =

Ruler of the kingdom of Elam in 522 BCE

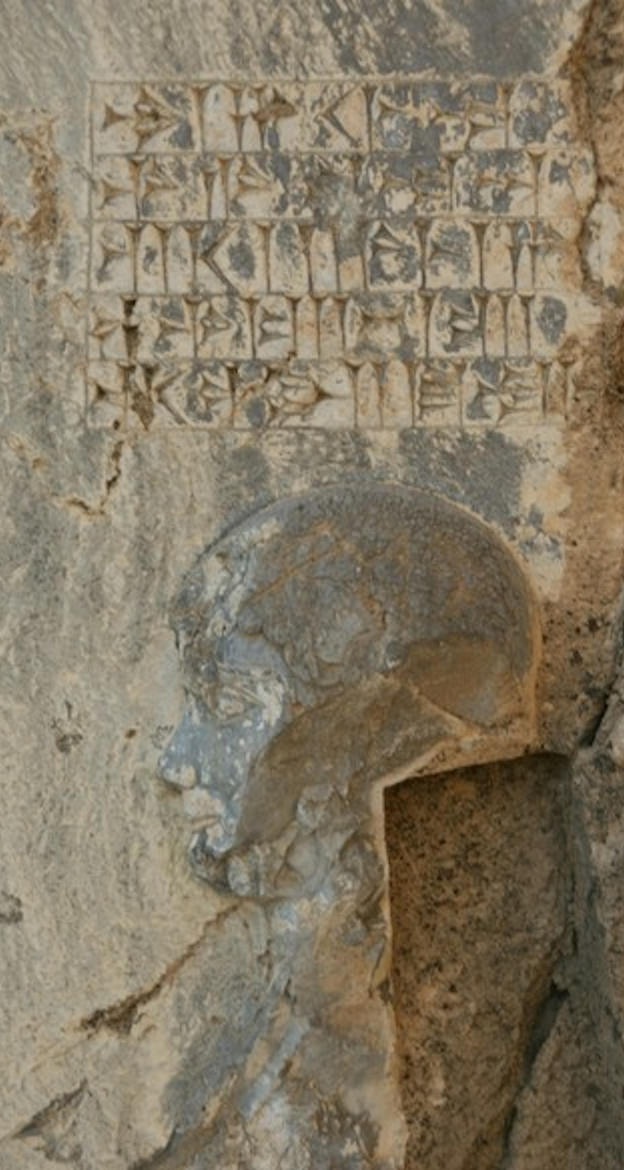
Relief of Âššina circa 519 BC. The label over him says: "This is Âššina. He lied, saying "I am king of Elam.""

Açina, also Âššina, was one of the last kings of the kingdom of Elam, and ruled briefly in 522 BCE. He was toppled by Darius I and later depicted in chains in the Behistun Inscription.

According to Darius in his inscription:

King Darius says: After I had slain Gaumâta, the Magian, a certain man named Âššina, the son of Upadarma, raised a rebellion in Elam, and he spoke thus unto the people of Elam: 'I am king in Elam.' Thereupon the people of Elam became rebellious, and they went over unto that Âššina: he became king in Elam. And a certain Babylonian named Nidintu-Bêl, the son of Kîn-Zêr, raised a rebellion in Babylon: he lied to the people, saying: 'I am Nebuchadnezzar, the son of Nabonidus.' Then did all the province of Babylonia go over to Nidintu-Bêl, and Babylonia rose in rebellion. He seized on the kingdom of Babylonia. King Darius says: Then I sent (an envoy?) to Elam. That Âššina was brought unto me in fetters, and I killed him.

— Behistun inscription

== See also ==
- List of rulers of Elam
