= Usiris (Persian) =

General serving under Persian king Artaxerxes I

Usiris was a Persian general under King Artaxerxes I.

According to Ctesias, he commanded a Persian army of 200,000 men against the 150,000 men (excluding cavalry) of Satrap Megabyzus, who had rebelled against the king.

During the battle, Usiris and Megabyzus engaged in single combat, both sustaining injuries. Usiris inflicted a spear wound on Megabyzus' thigh while Megabyzus wounded Usiris in the thigh and shoulder, causing him to fall from his horse. As Usiris fell, Megabyzus, protected him and ordered his life to be spared.

Many Persians died in the battle, but Megazybus emerged victorious, with his sons Zopyrus and Artyphius, distinguishing themselves.

Petisas, son of Usiris, was the father of Spitamas.

Apart from Ctesias, no other classical sources mention Usiris.

== Sources ==
- Ctesias, 40, 42
- Briant, Pierre, From Cyrus to Alexander: A History of the Persian Empire (2002). Translated by Peter T. Daniels. Winona Lake, Indiana: Eisenbrauns. ISBN 1-57506-031-0. p 577.
- Lendering, J., "Xerxes II and Sogdianus"
