= Murashu family =

Sumerian house of the 5th century BC

The house of Murashu were a family of businessmen and moneylenders based at Nippur in Babylonia in the fifth century BCE. They left an archive of hundreds of cuneiform texts called the Murashu Archive which is often used to understand business and society in the Achaemenid Empire.

== Family name ==
Both Murašû and Murashu mean wild cat. The words are transliterated from mu-ra-šu-ú, as originally written in syllabic cuneiform script. The house is named after the head of the family.

Known species of wildcat of the ancient near east are Felis silvestris lybica.

== Evidence of archaeology ==
A large proportion of archaeological evidence on the family is from a house in Nippur, found within the remains of a twenty by ten foot room of the building. It was initially found during 1893 within the third expedition of the University of Pennsylvania at the site, at the time directed by John Henry Haynes. Known as the Murashu archive, these consist of clay tablets, 879 in total (numbering 879 during 2005 Provan, Long, Longman; 835 during 2001 Greenfield, Paul, Stone, Pinnick; 800 during 1999 Mieroop; and 650 during 1995 in Schramm) written in the languages Aramaic and Akkadian. The archive includes 657 different seal types (Bregstein).

=== Murashu tablets ===
The Murashu tablets provide a glimpse into what life was like for fifth-century Jewish descendants of the Babylonian Exile and captivity. After the Persian king Cyrus the Great captured Babylon in 539 BCE, he allowed and helped finance the return of Jews to Judea with the Edict of Cyrus in 538. The Murashu tablets are dated to this period after Jews were allowed to return to Judea. The fact that the banking house "Murashu & Sons" conducted business with Jews who decided to remain in Nippur rather than return to Judea suggests that life in Persian-controlled Nippur was at least somewhat tolerable for Jews.

The tablets discuss one such Jew, Udarna, son of Rahim-ili. Some of Udarna's property was stolen by his brother and nephew. To see that he might reacquire his property, Udarna brought his complaint to Bel-nadin-shumu, one of the sons of "Murashu & Sons." Udarna did have his property returned. In addition, no charges were brought against his brother or nephew. They also agreed that no offspring of Udarna would ever bring charges against Udarna's brother or nephew or their offspring. This act of forbidding any suit being brought against Udarna's brother and nephew or the generations after, was seemingly implemented to prevent a blood feud that might last generations.

Notably the Hebrew names contained within the tablets which begin with יהו (Yod Heh Waw) are all written “Yahu-” and never “Yeho”. This evidence from the Murashu documents thus corresponds to that from other sources: after the Exile the ordinary form of the divine name used as an initial theophorous element was yahu.

== Banking ==
HV Hilprecht considers the group ("firm") to be bankers and brokers, who were engaged in money-lending and trading operations in southern and central Babylonia for a period of 50 years from the end of the 5th century (Dandamaev, Lukonin, Kohl).

Three generations of the family are attested to in the Nippur documents. The archives ("legal" documentation) include matters concerning the less wealthy of Nippur living in the outer areas of the city, although also the interests of both royalty (the renting of fields - Dandamaev, Lukonin, Kohl) and those associated with these, participating as officials within their estate. The artifacts are dated to the time of the reign of the kings Artaxerxes I and Darius II, (otherwise dated 465, 464 or 455 to 404 or 403 BCE).

The core activity of the family was fief and estate land management, with members primarily active as creditors for workers of agricultural enterprises, in the lending and provision of equipment, seed, tools, irrigation and animals for this purpose, to individuals including Jews, these relevant as to the book of Ezekiel. The archive gives information on interaction and agreement and the like with 100 Jewish families. The family employed more than 60 agents. The house leased plots of land owned by civil servants (23 high court officials) and warriors (bow-lands, horse-lands and chariot lands) transferring rental payments and also subsequent taxes to the royal family. The government used the family for the purposes of the collection of tax on land (harāka [OP]) (the family "farmed out" taxes). The family had dealings with 2500 separate individuals, at least as evidenced by the archive document when Schniedewind states this includes in total an "...onomasticon of some 2500 names...".

The family's activities were centred on Lower Mesopotamia and did not involve trade with distant regions. Family members sometimes travelled to the Achaemenid capital at Susa (in Elam, about 200 kilometres distant) where they remained for months involved in financial and legal businesses. Their activities skirted the edge of the law, as when they obtained the exclusive right to use land which they were not allowed to buy, but also helped people pay their taxes and provide service as conscripts, and it appears that their business was eventually shut down or restructured by the king's officials, causing someone to put away the texts which now form the Murashu archives.

== Original sources ==
- JA Thompson - The Bible and archaeology Paternoster Press, 1973 Retrieved 2012-07-10
- S Moshenskyi - History of the Weksel Sergei Moshenskyi, 1 Aug 2008 Retrieved 2012-07-10 ISBN 1436306949
- KR Nemet-Nejat - Daily Life in Ancient Mesopotamia Greenwood Publishing Group, 1998 Retrieved 2012-07-10 ISBN 0313294976

secondary

- JJ Collins, PW Flint - The Book of Daniel: Composition and Reception, Volume 1 BRILL, 2001 Retrieved 2012-07-28 ISBN 9004116753
- M.Dandameyev - [L Finkelstein, WD Davies eds.]- The Cambridge History of Judaism: Introduction; The Persian period Cambridge University Press, 16 Feb 1984 Retrieved 2012-07-28 ISBN 0521218802
- Cardascia, G. 1951, Les Archives des Murašû. Une famille d’hommes d’affaires babyloniens à l’époque perse (455-403 av. J.-C.). Imprimerie Nationale, Paris.
- Stolper, M. W. 1985, Entrepreneurs and Empire. The Murašû Archive, the Murašû Firm, and Persian Rule in Babylonia, PIHANS 54, NINO, Leiden.
- Francis Joannès, "La fin de Rēmūt-Ninurta, chef de la maison Murašû," Arta 2020.003 http://www.achemenet.com/pdf/arta/ARTA_2020.003_Joannès.pdf
