= Murašû Archive =

The Murašû Archive is a collection of cuneiform tablets, excavated between 1888 and 1900, from the ruins of Nippur in central Babylonia. Named after the chief member of a single family, the Murašû Archive is a collection of business records that spans four generations. Assembled during the reigns of the Persian kings Artaxerxes I, Darius II, and Artaxerxes II, the Murašû Archive provides the largest and most illuminating view into the business activities and conditions of Persian-ruled Babylonia during the last hundred and fifty years of the Achaemenid kingship.

== Excavation and discovery ==
In a series of excavations directed by John Henry Haynes, the Murašû Archive was discovered six meters under a mound on the floor of a small room. The original collection comprised 330 whole tablets, 400 or more damaged tablets and fragments, and 20 small clay tags with seal impressions. After the original discovery, a portion of the tablets was shipped to Istanbul for analysis, where Hermann Vollrat Hilprecht first identified the texts as records of a late Babylonian business house called “Murašû Sons of Nippur”. Over the years, the Murašû Archive was scattered around the world, to museums and private collections in London, Istanbul, Philadelphia, Jena, and California.

== Contents of the tablets ==
The Murašû Archive comprises business records regarding legal issues, loans, rents, transactions, trips to various capital cities, and the use of agents and subordinates to manage affairs. In essence, the Murašû Archive was the business repository of the Murašû firm - a business house dealing mainly with the management of agriculture. The Murašû firm would lease land and water from its owners, farm the land to produce crops, pay rents and taxes to the owners, and even sublet the leased lands to tenants, who would work the land with livestock, seeds, and equipment provided by the firm. In addition, the Murašû firm converted the produce from the lands they managed into specie—silver., which was lent on the basis of real security, or collateral.

== Context of greater socio-economic and political setting ==
The Murašû firm provides a greater insight into the economic strength and stability of the Persian-ruled provinces. Marc Van De Mieroop argues that, through such business practices as the Murašû firm, the Persians were able to draw upon their resources throughout their provinces and vassal states to pull together enormous armies with which to intimidate and conquer their enemies. Descriptions of the Persians by Greek writers such as Herodotus show how the armies and practices of the Persians left a very real impression on the western world and shape the classical western view of Asia.
