= Aspathines =

6th/5th-century Achaemenid official

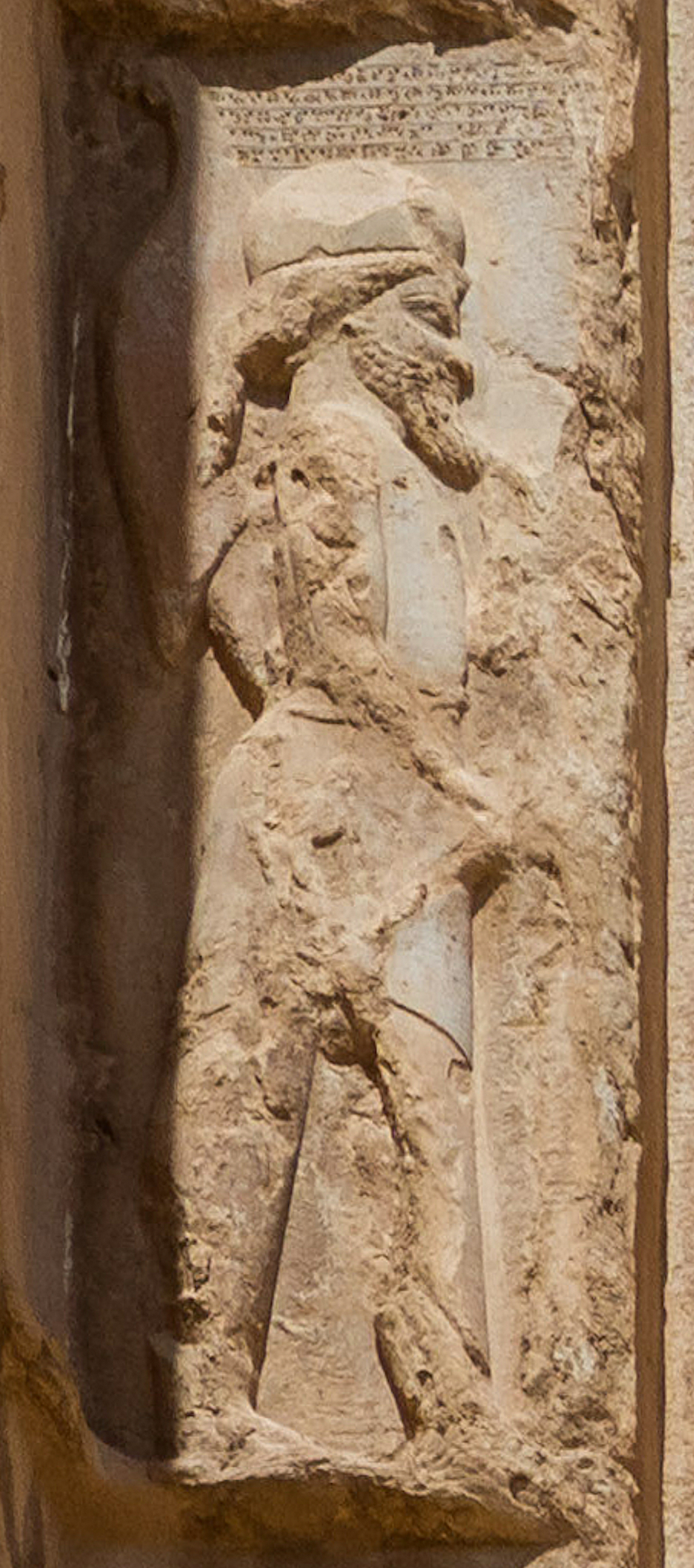
Aspathines on the tomb of Darius I.

Aspathines (Old Persian: 𐎠𐎿𐎱𐎨𐎴𐎠 Aspacanāʰ; Ancient Greek: Ἀσπαθίνης Aspathínēs) (born and died sometime between 550 BC and 450BC) was a senior official under Darius the Great and Xerxes I of Persia.

Aspathines is illustrated on the tomb of Darius I at Naqsh-e Rostam, with a dedication:

Aspacanâ \ vaçabara \ Dârayavahauš \ xš
âyathiyahyâ \ isuvâm \ dârayatiy
Aspathines, the bowbearer,
holds king Darius' battle-axe.

— DNd inscription of Darius at Naqsh-e Rostam.

The only other courtier to be named with a dedication was Gobryas.

Aspathines had a son names Prexaspes, who became an Admiral in the navy of Xerxes during the Second Persian invasion of Greece.
