= Intaphrenes =

Late 6th-century Iranian nobleman

Intaphrenes

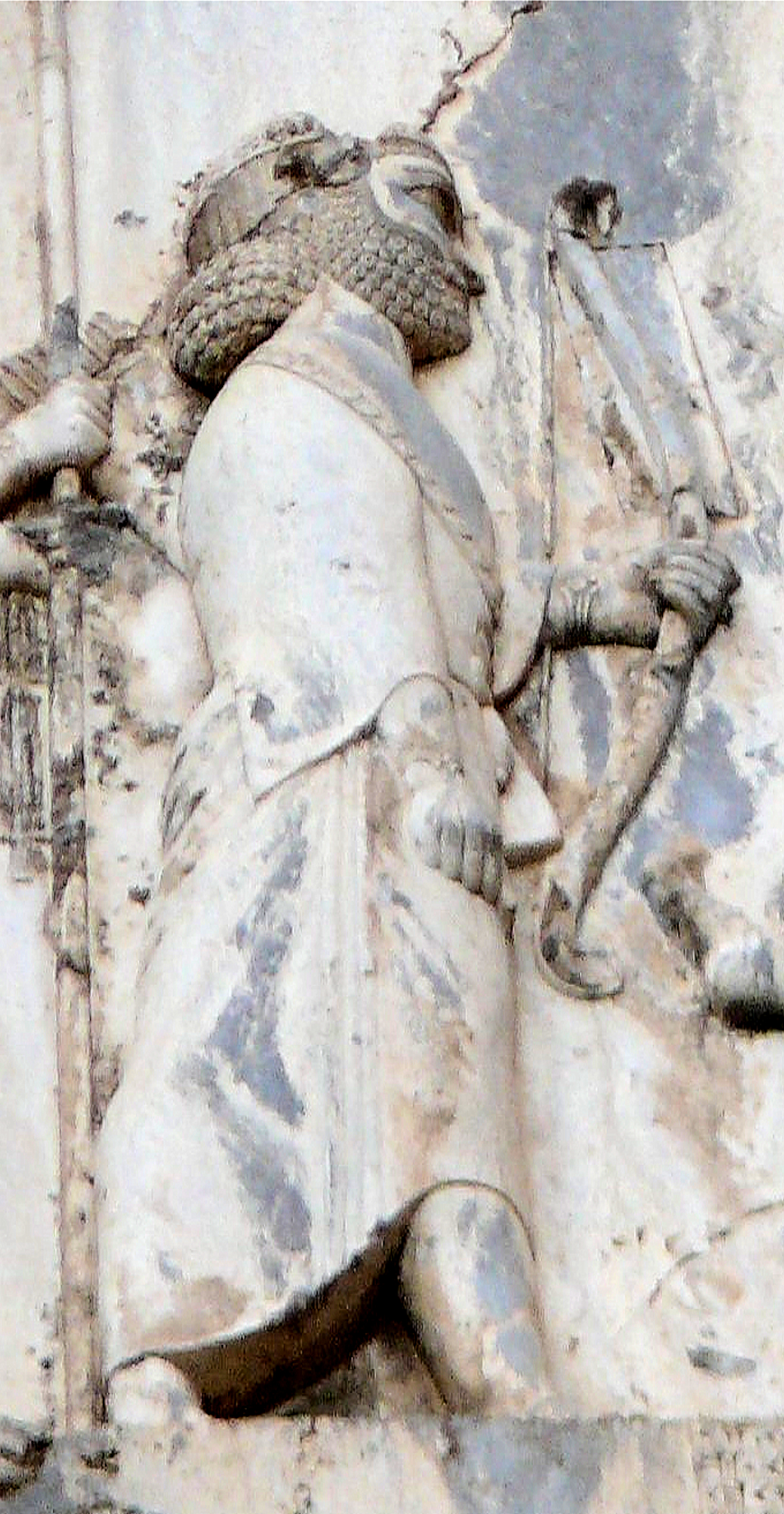
Intaphrenes as bow-carrier of Darius the Great on the Behistun Inscription reliefs.

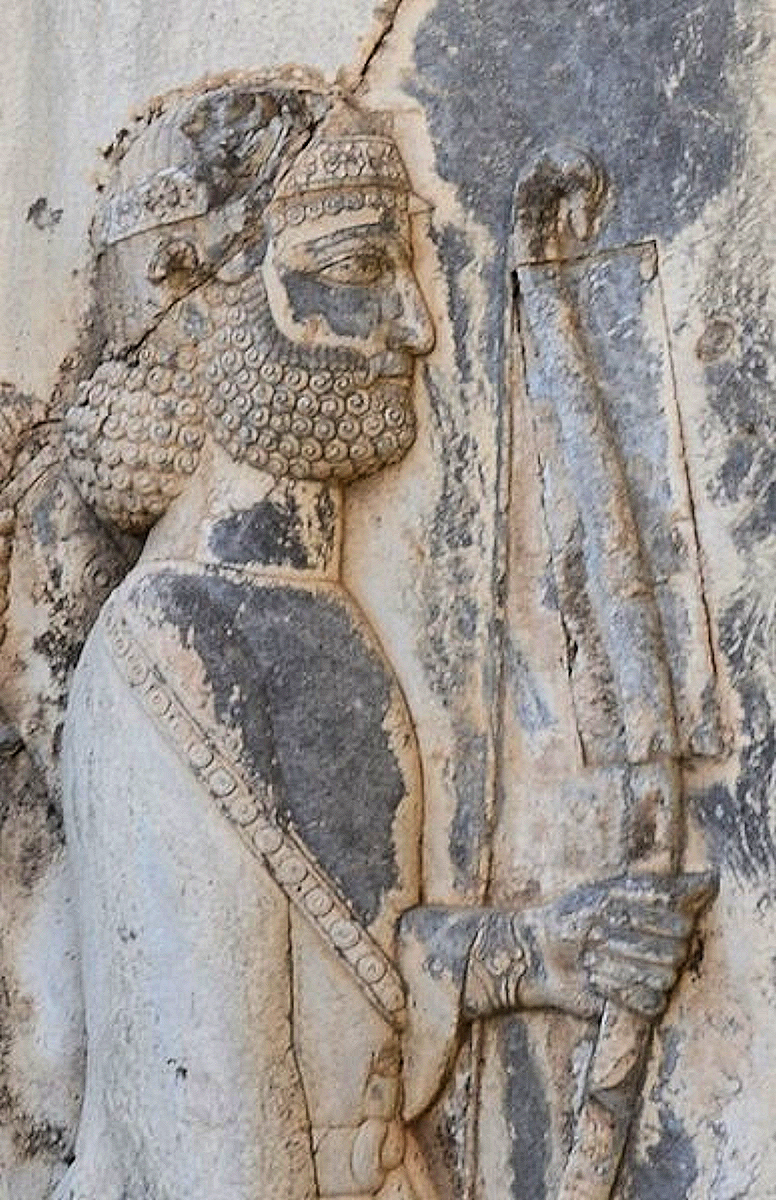
Intaphrenes at Behistun (detail).

Intaphrenes (Old Persian: 𐎻𐎡𐎭𐎳𐎼𐎴𐎠, romanized: Vi^{n}dafarnâ, Ancient Greek: Ἰνταφρένης, Ἰνταφέρνης, romanized: Intaphrénēs, Intaphérnēs) (died c. 520 BCE) was one of the seven who in September 522 BCE helped Darius I usurp the throne from Bardiya, following Bardiya’s alleged usurping of the throne of the Achaemenid Empire from Cambyses II. Intaphrenes then became Darius's bow carrier, a high position in which he is depicted in the Behistun Inscription.

== Subjugation of Babylon ==
In 521 BCE, Intaphrenes was sent as general at the head of an army by Darius I to eliminate Arakha, who allegedly had usurped the throne of Babylon as Nebuchadnezzar IV in 522 BCE. Babylon was taken without much fighting on 27 November 521 BCE, and as was customary in such cases, Arakha was mutilated and impaled with his followers.

"King Darius says: Then did I send an army unto Babylon. A Persian named Intaphrenes [Vidafarnâ], my servant, I appointed as their leader, and thus I spoke unto them: 'Go, smite that Babylonian host which does not acknowledge me.' Then Intaphrenes marched with the army unto Babylon. Ahuramazda brought me help; by the grace of Ahuramazda Intaphrenes overthrew the Babylonians and brought over the people unto me. On the twenty-second day of the month Markâsanaš (27 November) they seized that Arakha who called himself Nebuchadnezzar, and the men who were his chief followers. Then I made a decree, saying: 'Let that Arakha and the men who were his chief followers be crucified in Babylon!'"

— Behistun Inscription of Darius the Great

== Death ==
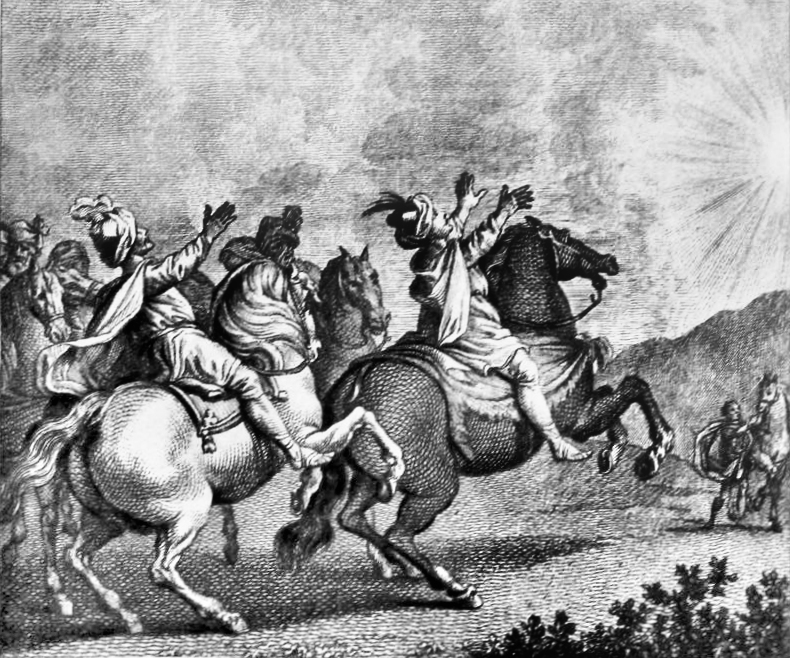
Darius I, and five other conspirators, including Intaphrenes, invoking the sun to become King.

Intaphrenes was put to death after the insurrection for trying to enter the King's palace while he was lying with his wife. The seven noblemen who had toppled Bardiya had made an agreement that they could all visit the new king whenever they pleased, except when he was with his wife. One evening, Intaphrenes went to the palace to meet Darius, but was stopped by two officers who stated that Darius had retired for the night. Becoming enraged and insulted, Intaphrenes drew his sword and cut off the ears and noses of the two officers. While leaving the palace, he took the bridle from his horse, and tied the two officers together. The officers went to the king and showed him what Intaphrenes had done to them. Darius began to fear for his own safety; he thought that all seven noblemen had banded together to rebel against him and that the attack against his officers was the first sign of revolt. He sent a messenger to each of the noblemen, asking them if they approved of Intaphrenes's actions. They denied and disavowed any connection with Intaphrenes's actions, stating that they stood by their decision to appoint Darius as King of Kings.

Taking precautions against further resistance, Darius sent soldiers to seize Intaphrenes, along with his son, family members, relatives and any friends who were capable of arming themselves. Darius believed that Intaphrenes was planning a rebellion, but when he was brought to the court, there was no proof of any such plan. Nonetheless, Darius killed Intaphrenes's entire family, excluding his wife's brother and son. She was asked to choose between her brother and son. She chose her brother to live. Her reasoning for doing so was that she could have another husband and another son, but she would always have but one brother. Darius was impressed by her response and spared both her brother's and her son's life.

The name Intaphrenes was never mentioned again by Herodotus after Intaphrenes's death.

== Bibliography ==
- Abbott, Jacob (1850), History of Darius the Great, New York: Harper & Bros
