= Gobryas (father of Mardonius) =

Persian governor of Elam (c. 521 BC)

Gobryas (Ancient Greek: Γοβρύας; Old Persian: 𐎥𐎢𐎲𐎽𐎢𐎺 g-u-b-ru-u-v, reads as Gaub(a)ruva?; Elamite: Kambarma) was father of Mardonius and lance-bearer of Darius I.

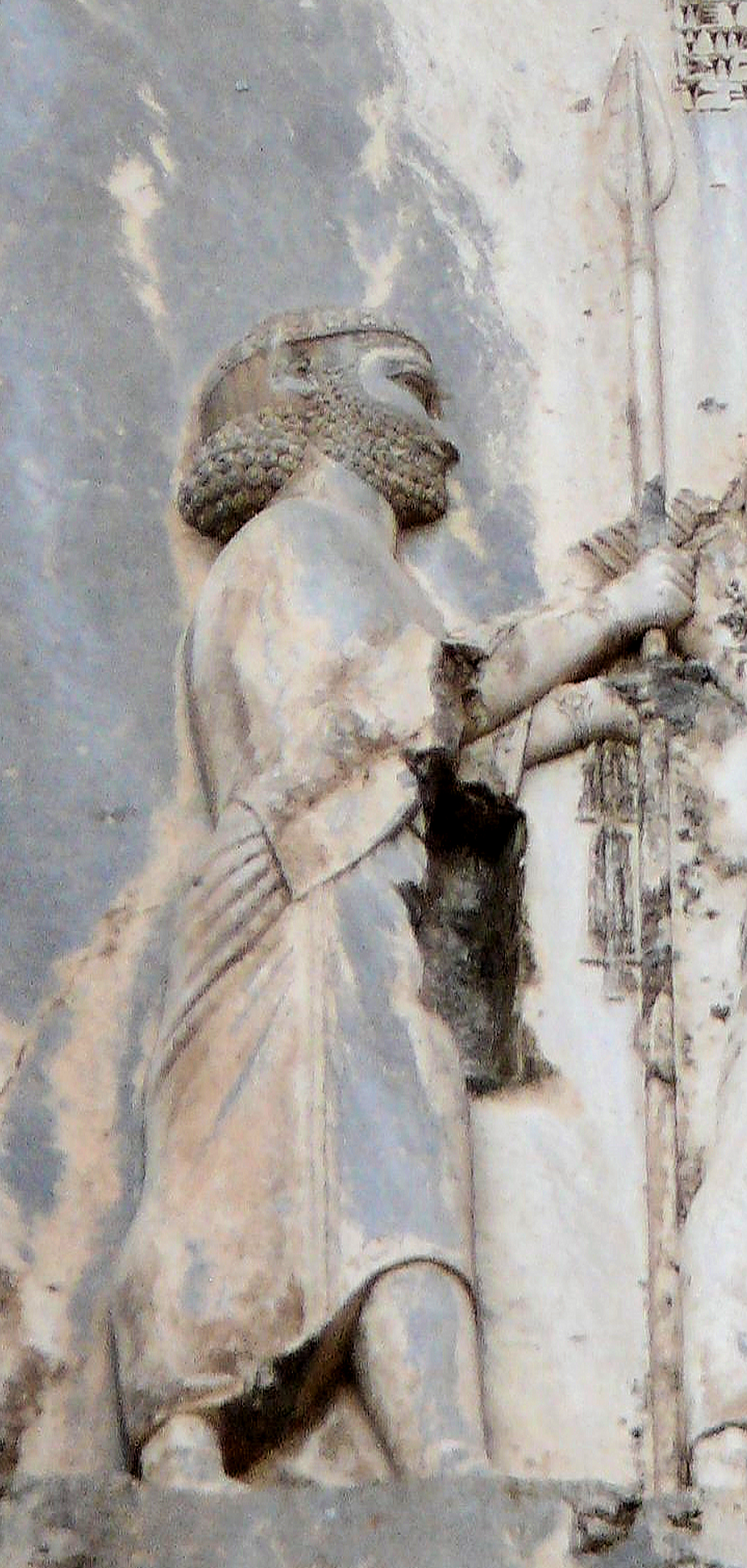
Gobryas, father of Mardonius, and lance-bearer of Darius, on the reliefs of Behistun.

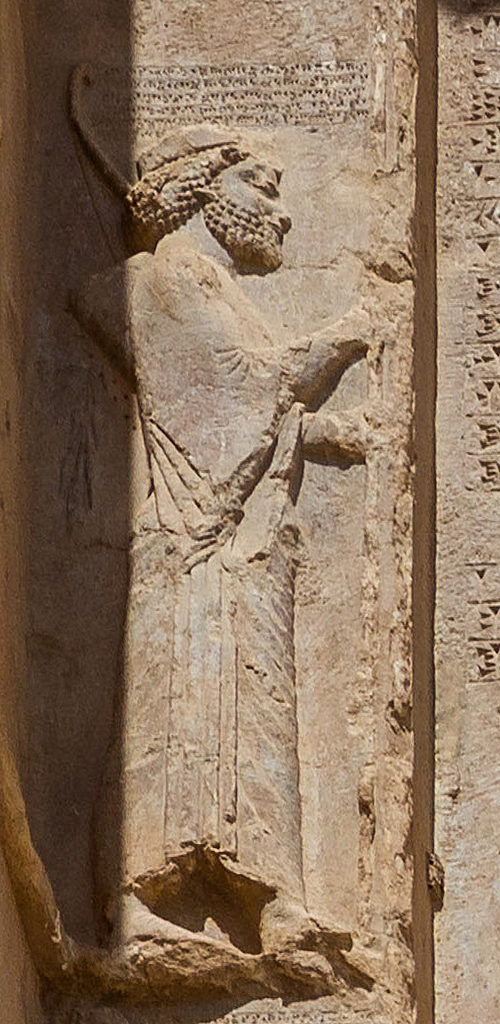
Gobryas on the tomb of Darius I.

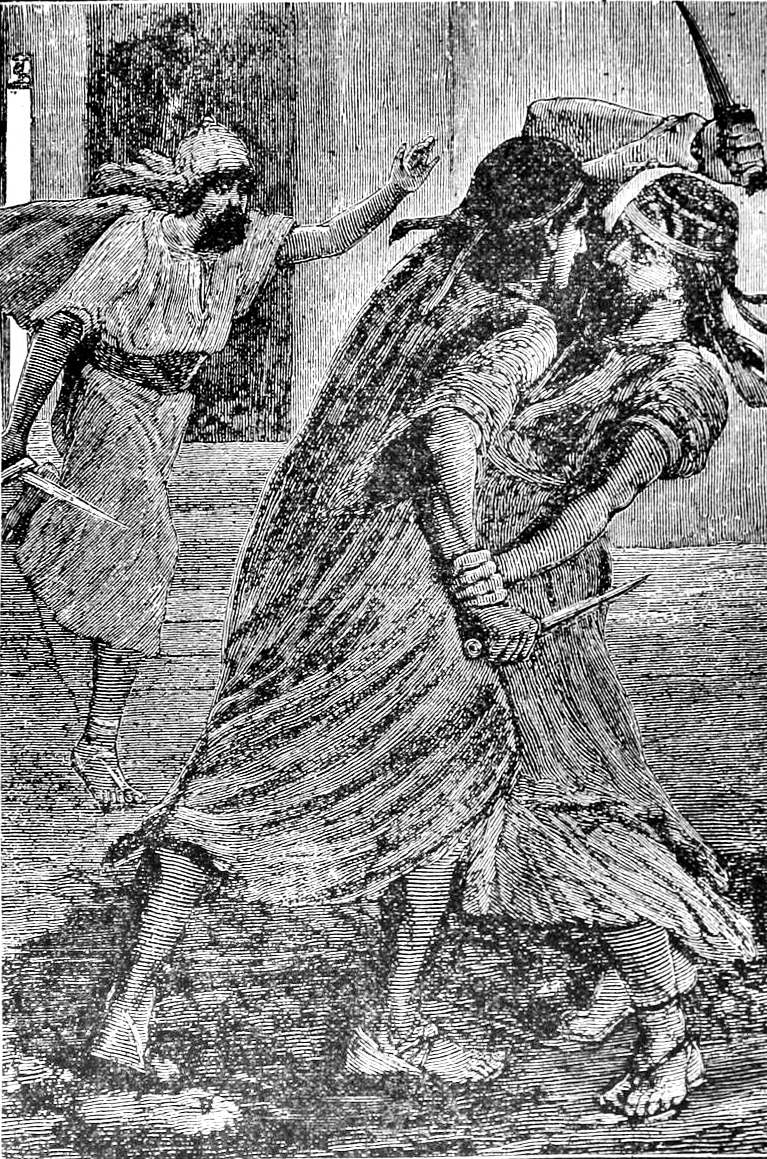
"The struggle between Gobryas and the false Smerdis", 19th century print.

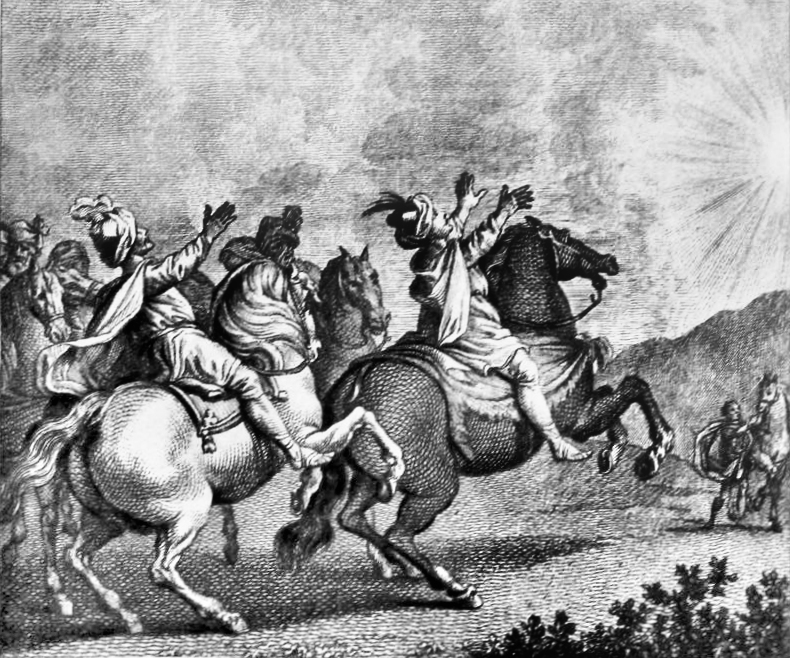
Darius I, and five other conspirators, including Gobryas, invoking the sun to become King.

Gobryas was one of the six helpers of Darius in killing Gaumāta in September 522 BC mentioned by Herodotus. He was appointed as Darius' lance carrier (arštibara). He is represented on the Behistun inscription and on Darius' tomb in Naqsh-e Rustam, as:

Gaubaruva \ Pâtišuvariš \ Dârayavahauš \ xšâyathiyahyâ \ arštbara
Gobryas from Pâtišuvariš, the lance carrier of king Darius.

Pâtišuvariš may be the mountainous region north of Alborz in northern Iran, probably Mazandaran. In 521 BC, he was sent to Elam to defeat the rebel king Atamaita; after this, he served as satrap of Elam.

Gobryas' family was closely entwined with the family of Darius the Great. Gobryas married the sister of Darius, known variously as Artazostre or Radušdukda. Their son Mardonius, was the Commander-in-Chief of the armies of Xerxes I in the Second Persian invasion of Greece, married Darius' daughter Artazostre. A daughter of Gobryas, from an earlier marriage, was married to Darius.
