= 424 BC =

424 BC in various calendars
Gregorian calendar	424 BC; CDXXIV BC
Ab urbe condita	330
Ancient Egypt era	XXVII dynasty, 102
Pharaoh	Artaxerxes I of Persia, 42
Ancient Greek Olympiad (summer)	89th Olympiad (victor)¹
Assyrian calendar	4327
Balinese saka calendar	N/A
Bengali calendar	−1017 – −1016
Berber calendar	527
Buddhist calendar	121
Burmese calendar	−1061
Byzantine calendar	5085–5086
Chinese calendar	丙辰年 (Fire Dragon); 2274 or 2067 — to — 丁巳年 (Fire Snake); 2275 or 2068
Coptic calendar	−707 – −706
Discordian calendar	743
Ethiopian calendar	−431 – −430
Hebrew calendar	3337–3338
- Hindu calendars
Vikram Samvat	−367 – −366
Shaka Samvat	N/A
Kali Yuga	2677–2678
Holocene calendar	9577
Iranian calendar	1045 BP – 1044 BP
Islamic calendar	1077 BH – 1076 BH
Javanese calendar	N/A
Julian calendar	N/A
Korean calendar	1910
Minguo calendar	2335 before ROC 民前2335年
Nanakshahi calendar	−1891
Thai solar calendar	119–120
Tibetan calendar	阳火龙年 (male Fire-Dragon) −297 or −678 or −1450 — to — 阴火蛇年 (female Fire-Snake) −296 or −677 or −1449

Year 424 BC was a year of the pre-Julian Roman calendar. At the time, it was known as the Year of the Tribunate of Crassus, Fidenas, Rutilus and Iullus (or, less frequently, year 330 Ab urbe condita). The denomination 424 BC for this year has been used since the early medieval period when the Anno Domini calendar era became the prevalent method in Europe for naming years.

== Events ==
=== By place ===
==== Persian empire ====
- Xerxes II rules as King of Persia for only about 45 days until he is killed. He is reportedly murdered, while drunk, by Pharnacyas and Menostanes on the orders of Sogdianus, the son of one of Artaxerxes I's concubines, Alogyne of Babylon.

==== Greece ====
- At the Congress of Gela, the statesman Hermocrates of Syracuse persuades the cities of Sicily to agree to make peace and urges the exclusion of foreign powers. As a result, the three-year war between his city and Sicily's pro-Athenian town ends and the Athenian forces, which had been sent to Sicily to support Greek settlements, are forced to withdraw.
- Demosthenes and Hippocrates attempt to capture Megara, but they are defeated by the Spartans under their general Brasidas. Demosthenes then marches to Naupactus to assist in a democratic revolution, and to gather troops for an invasion of Boeotia. However, Demosthenes and Hippocrates are unable to coordinate their attacks and Hippocrates is defeated at the Battle of Delium by Pagondas of Thebes. During the battle, Socrates is said to have saved the life of Alcibiades. Demosthenes attacks Sicyon and is defeated as well.
- After he frustrates the Athenian attack on Megara, Brasidas marches through Boeotia and Thessaly to Chalcidice at the head of 700 helots and 1000 Peloponnesian mercenaries to join the Macedonian king Perdiccas II. Refusing to be made a tool for the furtherance of Perdiccas' ambitions, Brasidas wins over the important cities of Acanthus, Stagirus, Amphipolis, and Torone as well as several minor towns. An attack on Eion is foiled by the arrival of Thucydides at the head of an Athenian squadron.
- Brasidas' capture of the city of Amphipolis is a major reverse for Athens, for which the Athenian general (and future historian) Thucydides is held responsible and banished. This gives Thucydides the opportunity for undistracted study for his History and travel and wider contacts, especially on the Peloponnesian side (Sparta and its allies).
- Nicias captures the Peloponnesian island of Cythera, from which to harry the Spartans.
- Aristophanes produces the comedy, Knights

=== By topic ===
==== Architecture ====
- The temple to Athena Nike (also known as the Wingless Victory) on the Athenian Acropolis is completed. It has been designed by the Athenian architect Callicrates.

==== Literature ====
Aristophanes' play "Knights" was first produced in the late winter of 424 B.C. at the Lenaean Dionysia and took first prize, defeating Cratinus, who came in second with Satyrs.( From: Roche, Paul. “Aristophanes: The Complete Plays.” The New American Library)

== Births ==
424/423 BC - estimated birth of Plato, a famous philosopher.

== Deaths ==
- The Achaemenid king Artaxerxes I and his wife Damaspia
- Xerxes II, King of Persia.
