= 423 BC =

423 BC in various calendars
- Gregorian calendar: 423 BC; CDXXIII BC
- Ab urbe condita: 331
- Ancient Egypt era: XXVII dynasty, 103
- Pharaoh: Darius II of Persia, 1
- Ancient Greek Olympiad (summer): 89th Olympiad, year 2
- Assyrian calendar: 4328
- Balinese saka calendar: N/A
- Bengali calendar: −1016 – −1015
- Berber calendar: 528
- Buddhist calendar: 122
- Burmese calendar: −1060
- Byzantine calendar: 5086–5087
- Chinese calendar: 丁巳年 (Fire Snake); 2275 or 2068 — to — 戊午年 (Earth Horse); 2276 or 2069
- Coptic calendar: −706 – −705
- Discordian calendar: 744
- Ethiopian calendar: −430 – −429
- Hebrew calendar: 3338–3339
- Hindu calendars
- Vikram Samvat: −366 – −365
- Shaka Samvat: N/A
- Kali Yuga: 2678–2679
- Holocene calendar: 9578
- Iranian calendar: 1044 BP – 1043 BP
- Islamic calendar: 1076 BH – 1075 BH
- Javanese calendar: N/A
- Julian calendar: N/A
- Korean calendar: 1911
- Minguo calendar: 2334 before ROC 民前2334年
- Nanakshahi calendar: −1890
- Thai solar calendar: 120–121
- Tibetan calendar: མེ་མོ་སྦྲུལ་ལོ་ (female Fire-Snake) −296 or −677 or −1449 — to — ས་ཕོ་རྟ་ལོ་ (male Earth-Horse) −295 or −676 or −1448

Year 423 BC was a year of the pre-Julian Roman calendar. At the time, it was known as the Year of the Consulship of Atratinus and Vibulanus (or, less frequently, year 331 Ab urbe condita). The denomination 423 BC for this year has been used since the early medieval period, when the Anno Domini calendar era became the prevalent method in Europe for naming years.

== Events ==
=== By place ===
==== Persian empire ====
- Ochus, satrap of Hyrcania and son of Artaxerxes I and a Babylonian concubine, seizes the Persian throne from his half brother Secydianus (or Sogdianus), whom he has executed. The new king rules as Darius II.

==== Greece ====
- The Athenian general, Laches, successfully moves in the Athenian Assembly for an armistice with Sparta to check the progress of Sparta's most effective general, Brasidas. However, the "Truce of Laches" has little impact on Brasidas and collapses within a year.
- Brasidas ignores the proposed year-long truce and proceeds to take Scione and Mende in the hope of reaching Athens and freeing Spartan prisoners. Athens sends reinforcements under Nicias who retakes Mende.

==== Rome ====
- Gaius Sempronius Atratinus and Quintus Fabius Vibulanus are elected as consuls
- Sextus Tempanius, Aulus Sellius, Sextus Antistius, and Spurius Icilius are chosen by the commons as tribunes

=== By topic ===
==== Drama ====
- Aristophanes' play The Clouds is performed as is Sophocles' play Maidens of Trachi and The Putine (The Bottle), by Cratinus.

== Deaths ==
- Sogdianus, King of Persia (assassinated)
