= Suffocation in ash =

Method of capital punishment

Suffocation in ash is a method of capital punishment in which an individual is suffocated in some way by being immersed into ash so as to cause asphyxiation. The practice is attested to have been used in the ancient Near East and Mexico.

== History ==
=== Ancient Persia ===
Ctesias reports this method from ancient Persia, but modern historians doubt the use of this method due to the contested nature of Ctesias as an informant and the fact that it is not recorded in older Near Eastern traditions. According to Ctesias, in ancient Persia, there existed an execution method where a tower/room was filled with ash, into which a condemned person was plunged. Wheels were constantly turned while he was alive, making the ash whirl about, and the person died by gradual suffocation as he inhaled the ash. The description can be found in Valerius Maximus and 2 Maccabees 13:5-8.

Reputedly, the first to suffer this punishment was Sogdianus. He killed his half-brother Xerxes II around 423 BC. Another half-brother, Ochus (later called Darius II) rebelled against him, and killed Sogdianus in this manner because he had promised Sogdianus he would not die by the sword, by poison or by hunger. At the instigation of his wife Parysatis, Darius II had his brother, Arsites, executed in the same manner for rebellion, along with Arsites' general Artyphius. Some time later, a rebelling general Pisuthnes met the same fate.

=== Seleucid Empire ===
In about 162 BC, Menelaus, Jewish high priest at Jerusalem was apparently put to death in this manner by Lysias, regent for Antiochus V, on charges of rebellion.

=== Texcoco ===
Nezahualcoyotl, a 15th-century, pre-Columbian, non-Aztec Acolhuan ruler of Texcoco in modern Mexico, designed a law code that is partially preserved. Those who had engaged in the active role of homosexual anal intercourse were suffocated in a heap of ash. Their passive partners had their intestines pulled out, then their bodies were filled with ash, and finally, were burnt.

== See also ==
- Grain entrapment
