= Hippocrates of Athens =

Athenian general (c. 459 – 424 BC)

- Ἱπποκράτης
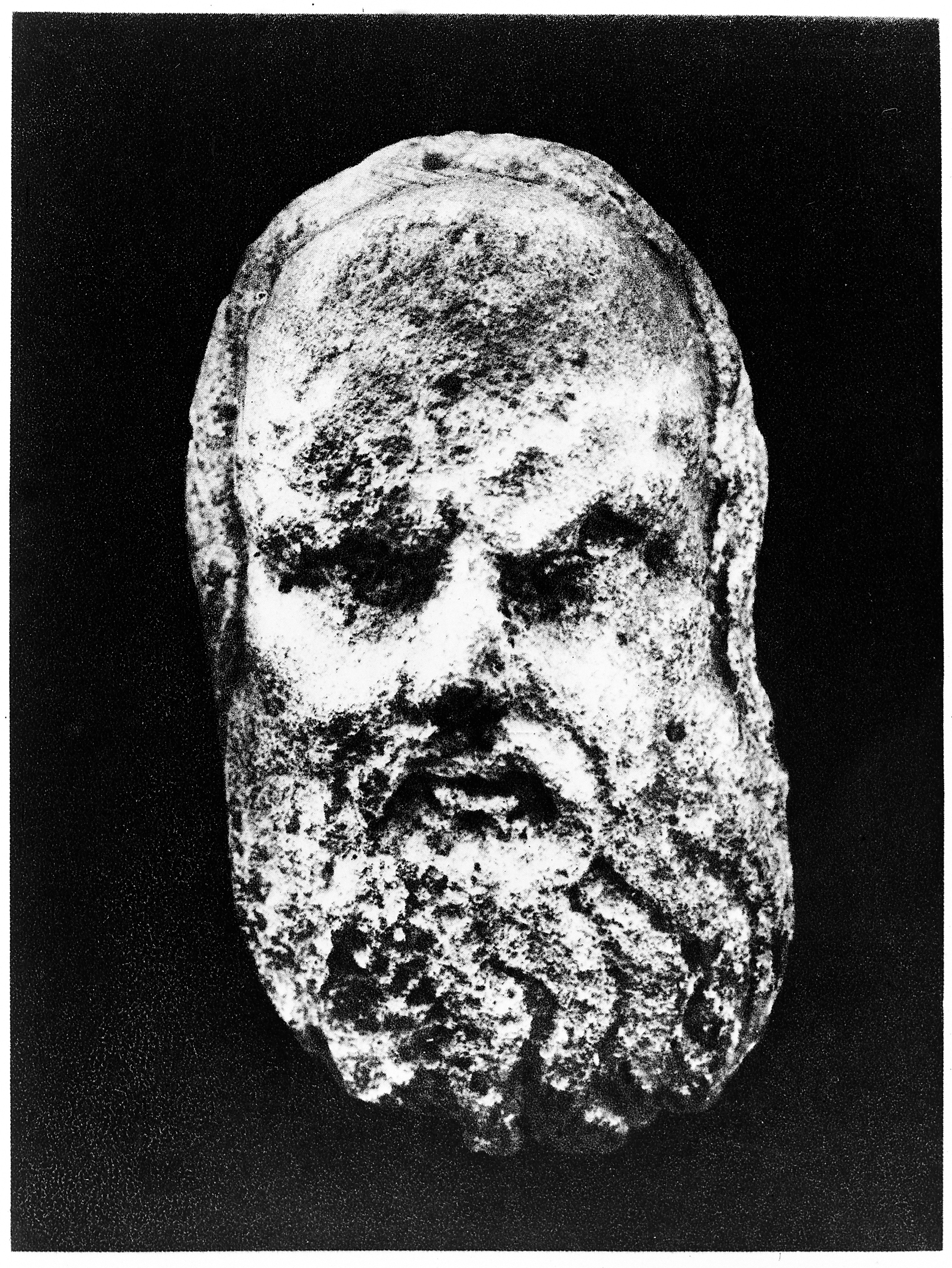
- Hippocrates bust in the Museum of Athens
- Born: c. 459 BC
- Died: 424 BC (aged 34-35); Delium, Boeotia
- Relatives: Ariphron
- Military career
- Allegiance: Athens
- Service years: 424 BC
- Rank: Strategos
- Conflicts: Peloponnesian War; Battle of Delium †

Hippocrates of Athens (Ancient Greek: Ἱπποκράτης, Hippokrátēs; c. 459 – 424 BC), the son of Ariphron, was a strategos of the Athenians in 424 BC, serving alongside Demosthenes.

In the summer of 424, Hippocrates and Demosthenes set out from Athens to seize the long walls of Megara (which connected the city with its port Nisaea). The Spartan garrison at Nisaea surrendered, but the Athenians were unable to capture Megara itself, and were compelled to withdraw when the Spartan general Brasidas arrived to relieve the Megarans. Hippocrates then commanded an Athenian force which invaded Boeotia. Hippocrates was given command of the land force that was to take Delium and he succeeded in doing so and fortifying a garrison there. When Hippocrates learned that the Boeotian army was approaching, Hippocrates began to retreat to Athens; he was unable to do so, and was defeated at the Battle of Delium by the Boeotian army under Pagondas. Hippocrates died near the beginning of the battle and nearly a thousand Athenians were slain alongside him. Only nightfall prevented further losses. After a siege of seventeen days, Delium fell to the Boeotians and at that point the bodies of Hippocrates and the other Athenian dead were returned to the Athenians.
