= Delium =

Historical Greek town

Coordinates: 38°20′46″N 23°39′41″E

Delium (Ancient Greek: Δήλιον, Dḗlion) was a small town in ancient Boeotia with a celebrated temple of Apollo. It was located upon the sea-coast in the territory of Tanagra in Boeotia, and at the distance of about a mile (1.6 km) from the territory of Oropus. This temple, which like the town took its name from the island of Delos, is described by Livy as overhanging the sea, and distant 5 miles (8.0 km) from Tanagra, at the spot where the passage to the nearest parts of Euboea is less than 4 miles (6.4 km). Strabo speaks of Delium as a temple of Apollo and a small town (πολίχνιον) of the Tanagraei, distant 40 stadia from Aulis.

There were two important battles at Delium. In the first battle, called the Battle of Delium, the Athenians suffered a signal defeat at the hands of the Boeotians in the eighth year of the Peloponnesian War, in 424 BCE. This battle took place over several days. Hippocrates, the Athenian commander, had seized the temple at Delium, which he converted into a fortress by erecting some temporary works. Leaving a garrison there, he was on his march homewards and had already reached the territory of Oropus, 10 stadia distant from Delium, when he encountered the Boeotian army advancing to cut off his retreat. The Athenians numbered 15,000, while the Boeotians mustered 18,500. The Athenians were defeated in the ensuing battle, losing 1,200, including Hippocrates, while the Boeotians lost only 500.

On the seventeenth day after the battle, the Boeotians retook the temple. The war was won in 404 BCE, with financial help from the Persians.

In the second battle, the Romans were defeated by Antiochus III the Great in 192 BCE.

Its site is located near modern Dilesi.
