= Disembowelment =

Removal of organs from the gastrointestinal tract

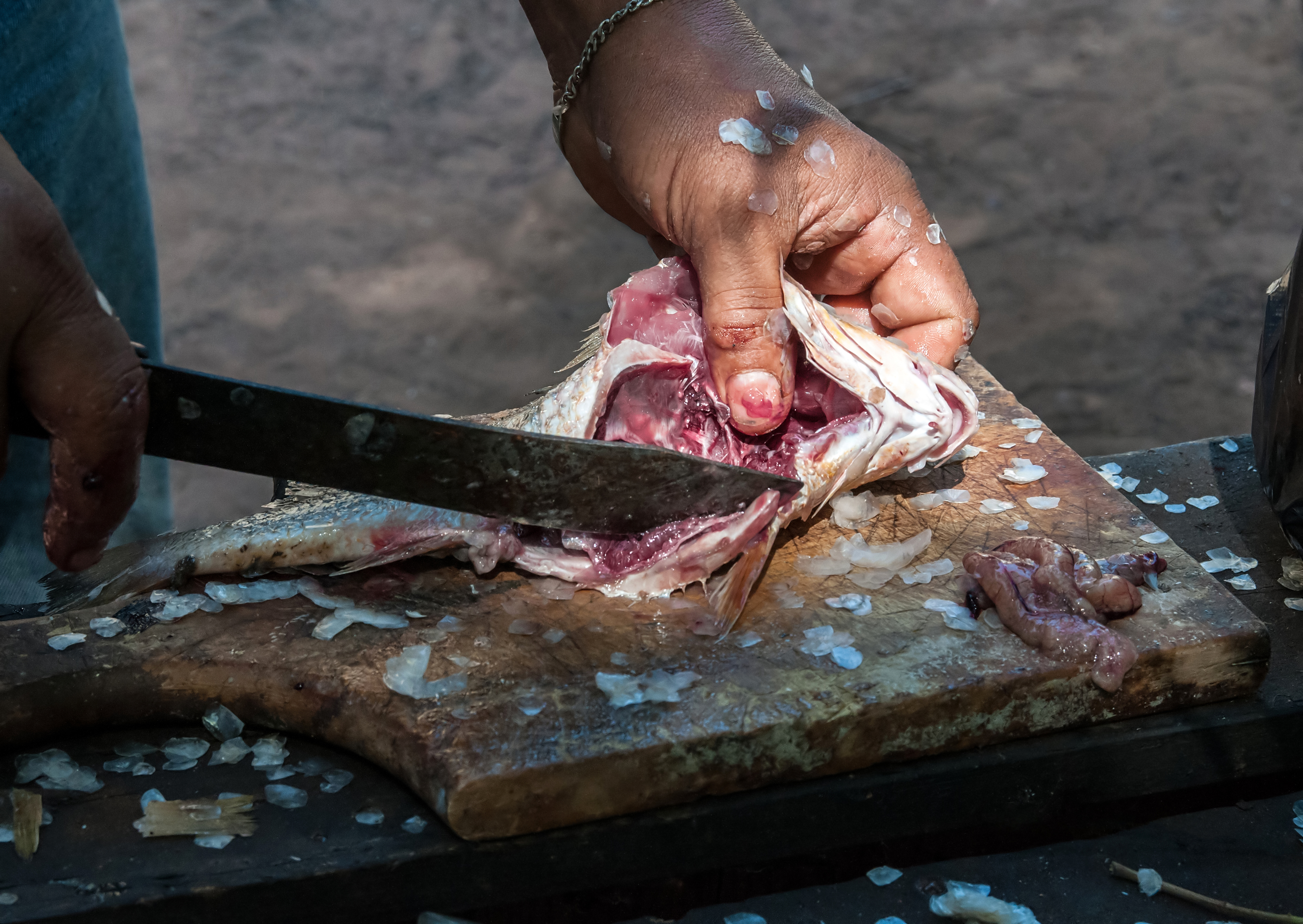
Disemboweling a fish during food preparation

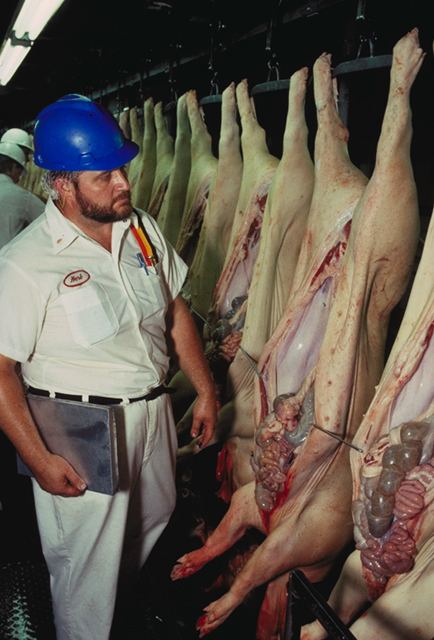
Swine inspection by USDA of disemboweled hogs

Disembowelment, disemboweling, evisceration, eviscerating or gutting is the removal of organs from the gastrointestinal tract (bowels or viscera), usually through an incision made across the abdominal area. Disembowelment is a standard routine operation during animal slaughter. In ancient Rome, disembowelment of animals was practiced for divination, and was known as haruspicy. Disembowelment of humans may result from an accident, but has also been used as a method of torture or execution. In such practices, disembowelment may be accompanied by various forms of torture or the removal of other vital organs.

== Dressing of animals ==
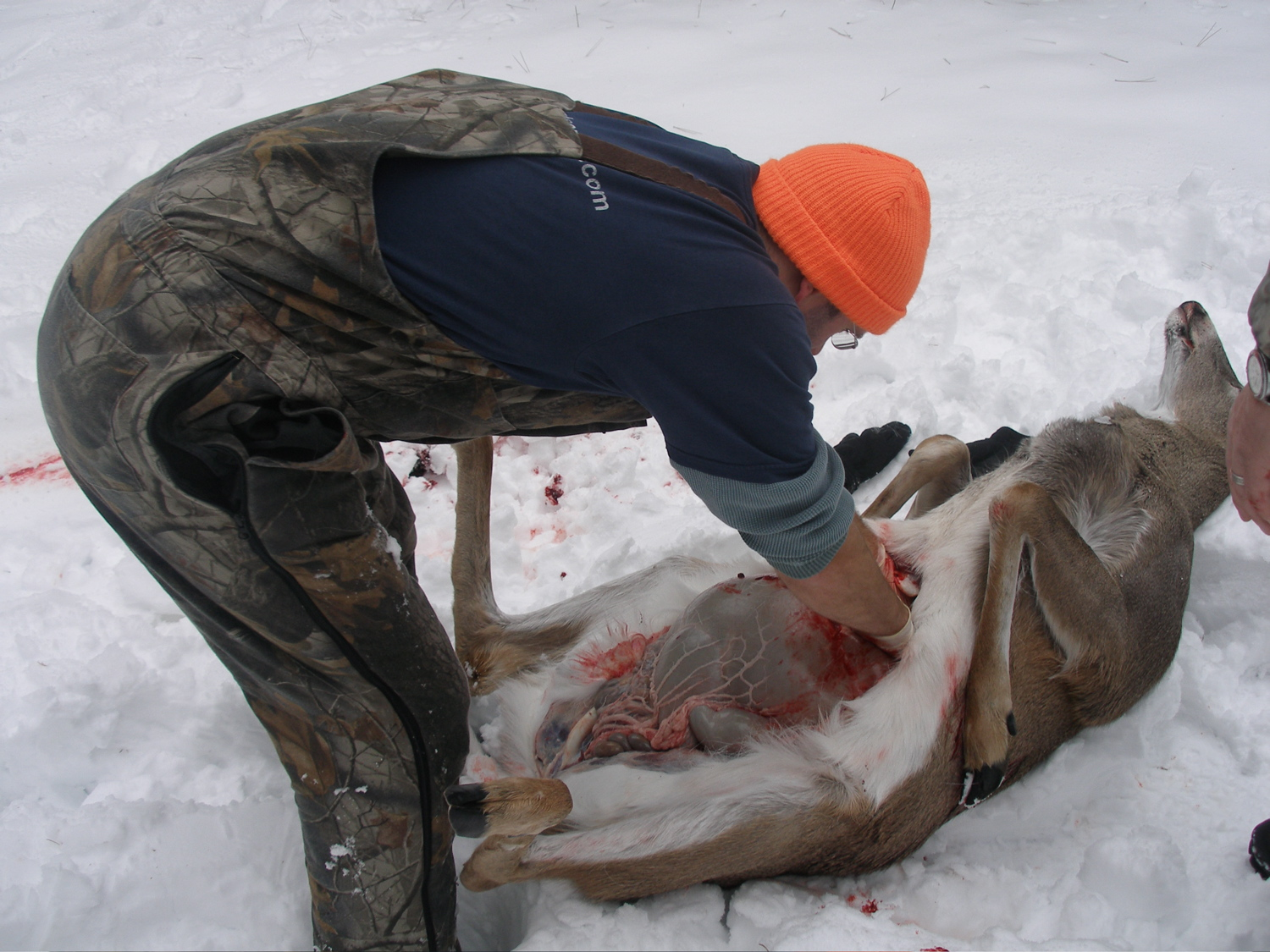
Deer hunter in the state of Michigan in the United States field-dressing a deer

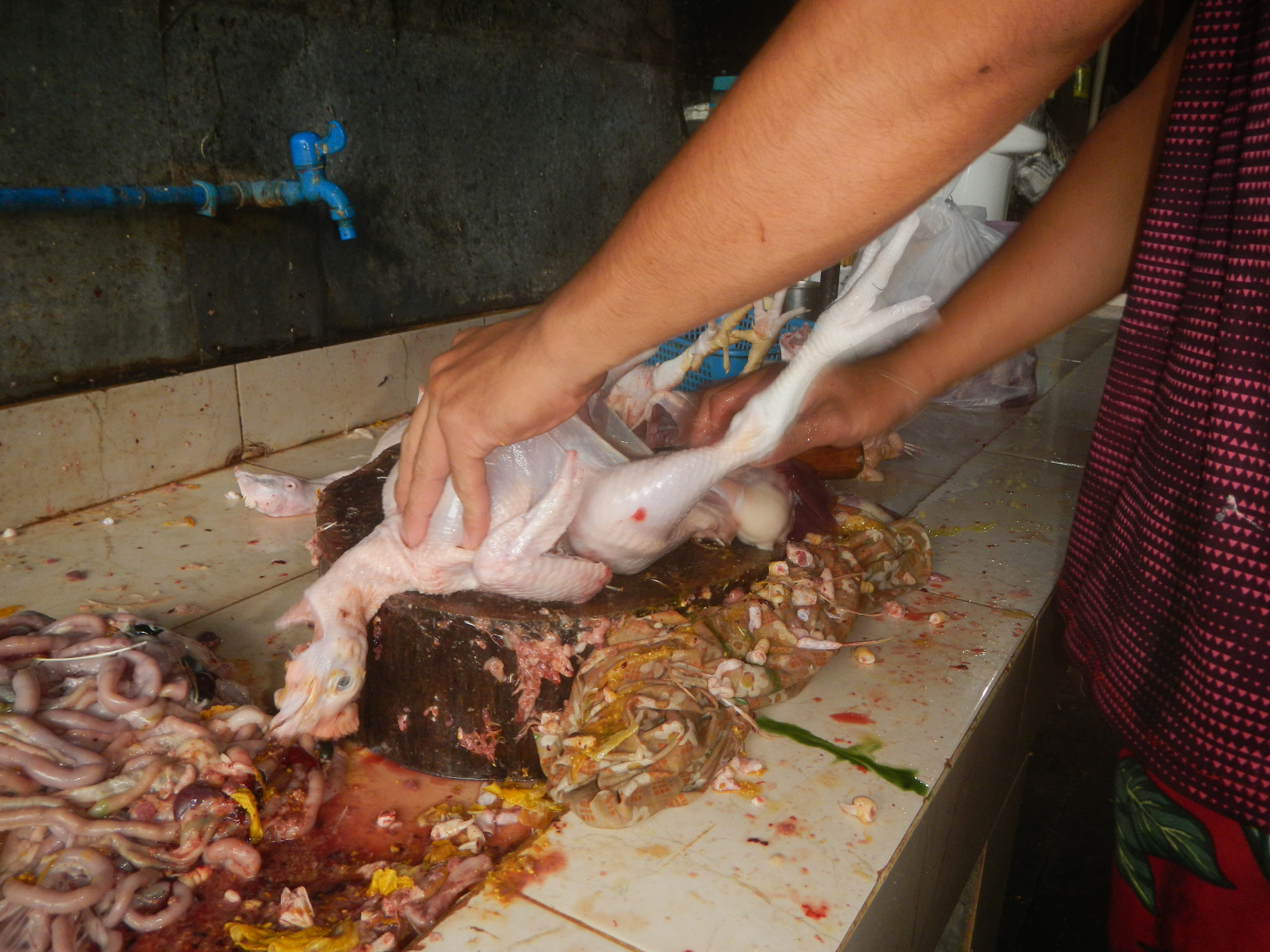
Men cleaning, dressing, gutting and cutting chickens in the Philippines

The removal of internal organs is a typical operation in meat processing also known as dressing. Land animals and birds are typically killed and bled before the dressing. The process of dressing includes the removal of heart, liver and lungs (pluck) as well as disembowelment by an abdominal cut. Disembowelment is typically accompanied by bung dropping or bunging. Bung dropping is the circumcision of the rectum from the carcass and is the first step of the gutting. Puncturing of bowels are avoided during the evisceration. Otherwise, bacteria from the intestinal contents might spread over the carcass. In case of birds, the abdominal cut extends up to the cloaca separating it from the rest of the skin.

=== Industrial dressing line ===
A bung dropper is a device used in slaughterhouses for fast bung dropping in a dressing line. The probe of a bung dropper is inserted into the rectum to loosen it from the carcass by circumcising with a sharp rotating cylinder. Belly opener is a device for performing the abdominal cut.

== Mummification and embalming ==
Some types of animal mummification include evisceration. The process of embalming sometimes includes removing the internal organs. Mummification, especially as practiced by the ancient Egyptians, entailed the removal of internal organs prior to the preservation of the remainder of the body. The removed organs were embalmed, stored in canopic jars and then placed in the tomb with the body.The removing of the organs could be either by an incision in the inguinal region, which was the most common practice or transperineal with a perineal incision as seen in the Younger Lady, possible the mother of Tutankhamun.

James Cook, on his second voyage, noted an embalming custom on some of the Pacific islands his crew visited, a custom utilizing transanal evisceration:

We found the body not only entire in every part; but, what surprised us much more, was, that putrefaction had scarcely begun (...); though the climate is one of the hottest, and Tee had been dead above five months.(...) Such were Mr. Anderson's remarks to me, who also told me, on his enquiring into the method of effecting this preservation of their dead bodies, he had been informed, that, soon after their death, they are disemboweled, by drawing their intestines, and other viscera, out at the anus; and the whole cavity is then filled or stuffed with cloth; introduced through the same part(...)

== Transanal evisceration of humans ==
When a portion of the intestinal tract is forcefully pulled from or expelled from the body through the anus, it is referred to as transanal evisceration. Following the first report of transanal evisceration by Brodie in 1827, more than 70 cases have been reported to date, the majority occurring spontaneously in elderly individuals. Straining, chronic constipation, and rectal ulcerations predispose to spontaneous perforation in elderly individuals.

Cases of transanal evisceration of children whilst sitting over uncovered swimming pool drains have been reported; notable cases include Valerie Lakey (1993) and Abigail Taylor (2007). In Taylor's case, the suction dislodged and damaged her liver and pancreas; several meters of her small intestine were forcefully pulled through her anus. In both these cases, the victims were left with short bowel syndrome and required feeding by total parenteral nutrition. After multiple operations, Taylor later died from transplant-related cancer.

A person, usually a child, can suffer a similar injury if a heavy weight is applied directly over the abdomen. Large intestine (rectosigmoid) rupture with transanal evisceration has been reported from blunt abdominal trauma and suction injuries. A direct blow or impingement of intestine between the vertebrae and anterior abdominal wall results in sudden increase in the intra-abdominal or intraluminal pressure of the intestine and rupture. The downward pressure forces a portion of the intestine to burst from the anus.

== Disembowelment of humans as torture and deterrence ==
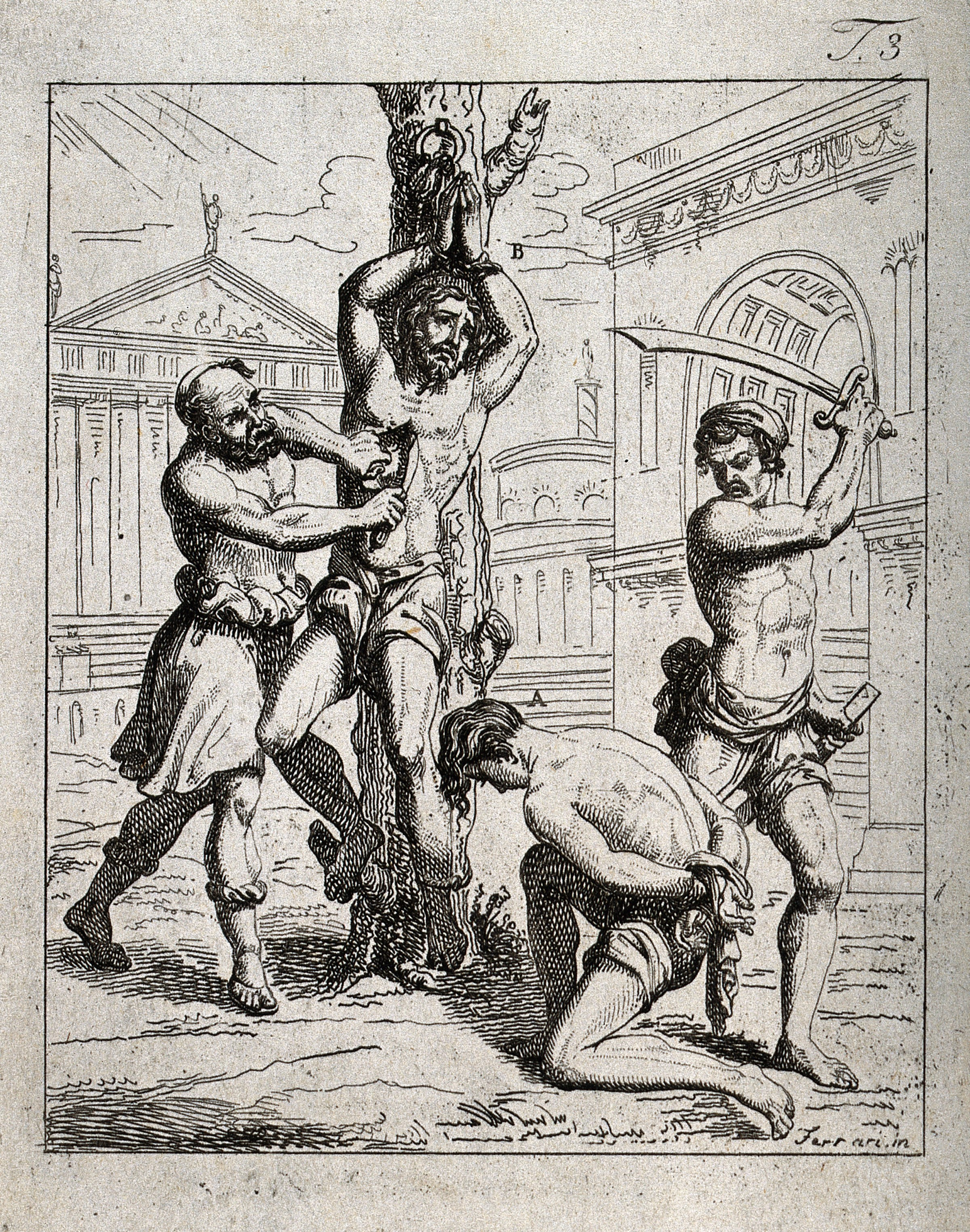
Martyrdom by disembowelling and by decapitation of two men

If a living person is disemboweled, it is invariably fatal without major medical intervention. Historically, disembowelment has been used as a severe form of capital punishment.

=== Asia ===
==== Vietnam ====
Various accounts have asserted that during the Vietnam War, members of the Viet Cong sometimes made calculated use of disembowelment as a means of psychological warfare, to coerce and intimidate rural peasants. Peer De Silva, former head of the Saigon department of the Central Intelligence Agency (CIA), wrote that from as early as 1963, Viet Cong units were using disembowelment and other methods of mutilation as psychological warfare. The extent, however, to which this punishment was perpetrated may be impossible to gauge and while detailed accounts survive regarding how civilians were disemboweled by Viet Cong, the use of this torture appears to have been quite arbitrary and there is no record that such actions were sanctioned by the North Vietnamese government in Hanoi. Disembowelment and other methods of intimidation and torture were intended to frighten civilian peasants at a local level into cooperating with the Viet Cong or discourage them from cooperating with the South Vietnamese Army or its allies.

=== Europe ===
==== Romania ====
In early 1941, during the Bucharest pogrom in which 125 Jewish civilians were killed, multiple cases of torture including disembowelment were recorded.

==== Netherlands ====
On 10 July 1584, Balthasar Gérard shot and killed William of Orange, who had advocated for Dutch independence from the King of Spain. The assassin was interrogated and condemned to death almost immediately. On 14 July, after suffering various tortures during each of the five days since the assassination, Gérard was disemboweled and dismembered while still alive, after which his heart was torn out and then he was beheaded by his Dutch executioners.

==== Roman Empire ====
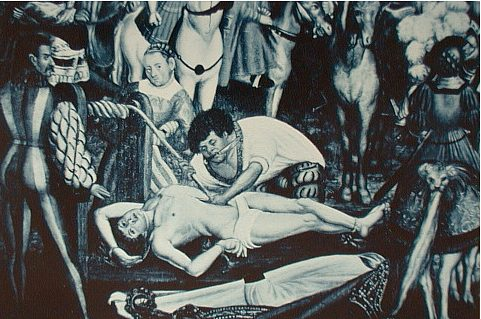
Martyrdom of saint Erasmus

Christian tradition states that Erasmus of Formiae, also known as Saint Elmo, was finally executed by disembowelment in about A.D. 303, after he had suffered extreme forms of torture during the persecutions of Emperor Diocletian and Maximian.

==== England ====
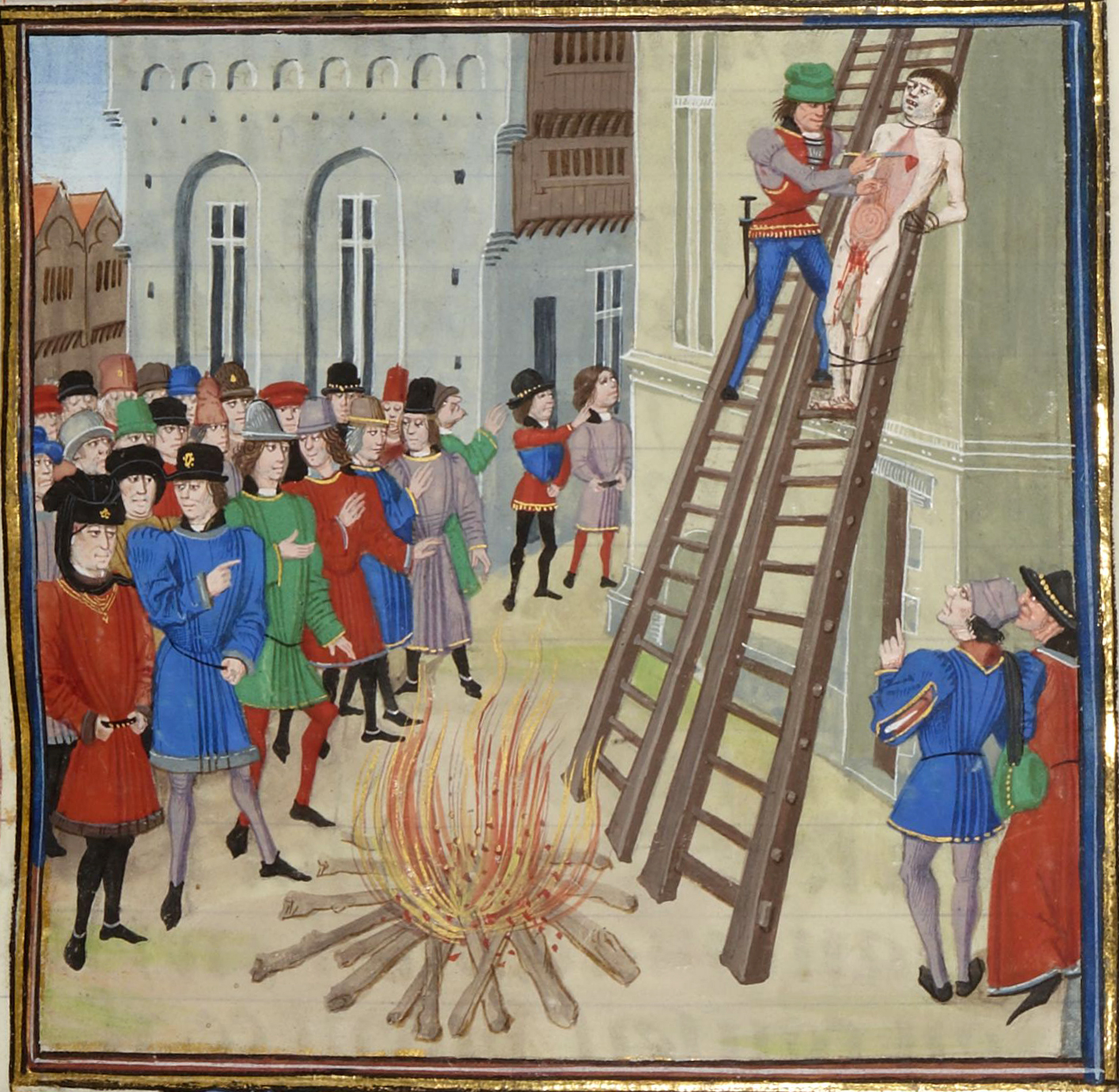
The execution of Hugh Despenser the Younger, who was hanged, drawn and quartered for high treason in 1326

In England, the punishment of being "hanged, drawn and quartered" was typically used for men convicted of high treason. This referred to the practice of dragging a man by a hurdle (similar to a fence panel) through the streets, removing him from the hurdle and (1) hanging him from the neck (but removing him before death), (2) drawing (i.e. disembowelling) him slowly on a wooden block by slitting open his abdomen, removing his entrails and his other organs (which were frequently thrown on a fire), and then decapitating him and (3) quartering, i.e. dividing the body into four pieces. The man's head and quarters would often be parboiled and displayed as a warning to others. As part of the disembowelment, the man was also typically emasculated and his genitals and entrails would be burned.

William Harrington, Hugh le Despenser the Younger and William Parry are examples of men who were hanged, drawn and quartered – tortured on the rack, hanged until not quite dead, subjected to emasculation, disembowelment and then chopped into quarters.

==== Germany ====
From the 15th century, ordinances are retained that threaten with a terrible punishment those who stripped off the bark of a standing tree in the common woods. A typical wording is found in the 1401 ordinance from Oberursel:

"...and whoever is caught stripping off a standing tree, mercy would have been more beneficial to him than the law is; for when law is to be fulfilled, then one is to cut up his stomach at the navel, and pull out a length of the gut. The gut is to be nailed to the tree, and one is keep going around that tree with the person, so long as he still has any part of the gut left in his body."

Jacob Grimm observes that no case of the punishment being carried out has been found in records from that period (15th century), but 300 to 500 years earlier, the Western Slavic tribes like the Wends are said to have revenged themselves upon Christians by binding the guts to an erect pole and driving them around until the person was fully eviscerated. In the 13th century, members of the now extinct Baltic ethnic group of Old Prussians in one of the battles against the Teutonic Knights, are said to have captured one such knight in 1248 and made him undergo this punishment.

=== Americas ===
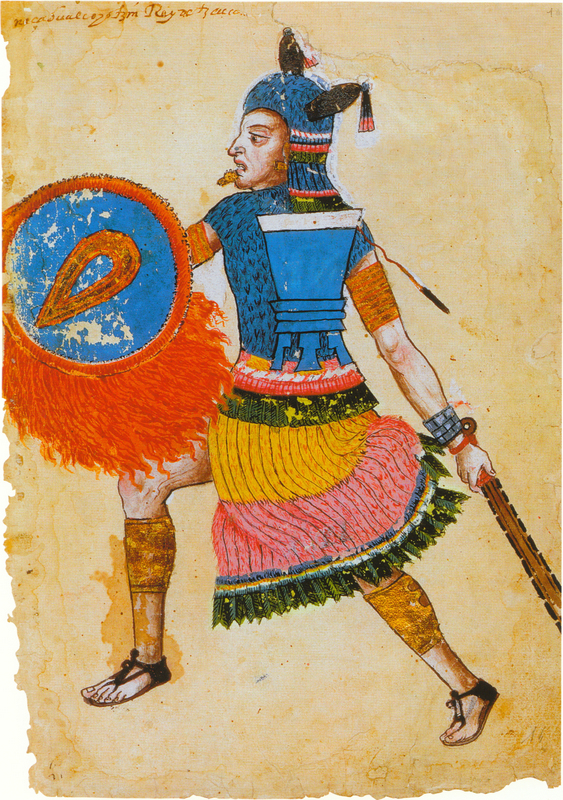
Nezahualcoyotl as shown in the Codex Ixtlilxochitl, folio 106R, painted roughly a century after Nezahualcoyotl's death

Nezahualcoyotl, a 15th-century Acolhuan ruler of Texcoco, a member of the Aztec Triple Alliance (now Mexico), promulgated a law code that was partially preserved. Those who had engaged in the passive role of homosexual anal intercourse had their intestines pulled out, then their bodies were filled with ash, and finally, were burnt. The active or penetrating partner was simply suffocated in a heap of ash.

== Suicide ==
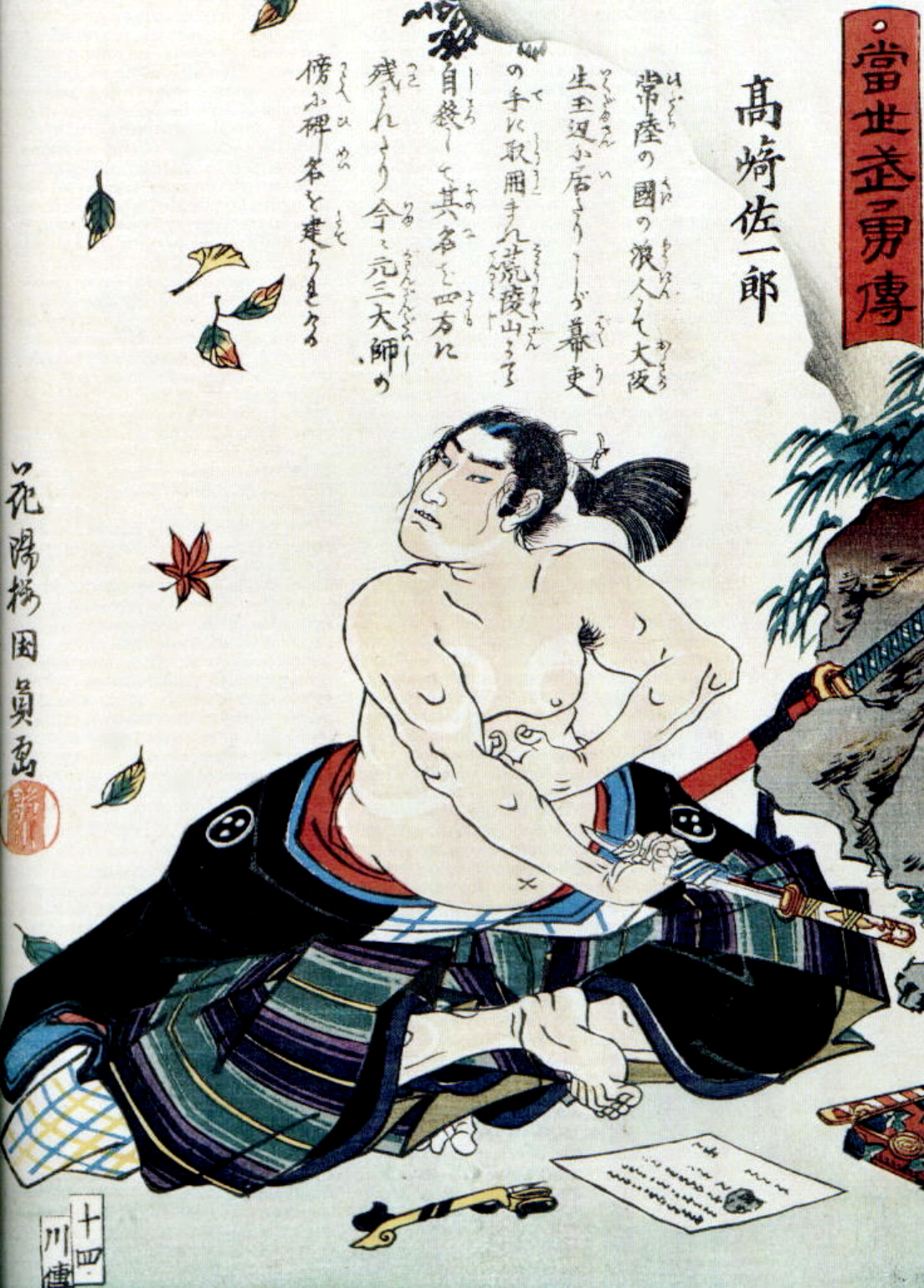
Ukiyo-e woodblock print of warrior about to perform seppuku, from the Edo period

In Japan, disembowelment played a central part as a method of execution or the ritualized suicide of a samurai. In killing themselves by this method, they were deemed to be free from the dishonor resulting from their crimes. The most common form of disembowelment was referred to in Japanese as seppuku (or, colloquially, hara-kiri), literally "stomach cutting," involving two cuts across the abdomen, sometimes followed by pulling out one's own viscera.

The act of decapitation by a second (kaishaku-nin) was added to this ritual suicide in later times in order to shorten the suffering of the samurai or leader, an attempt at rendering the ritual more humane. Even later the knife was just a simple formality and the swordsman would decapitate before the subject could reach for it. The commission of a crime or dishonorable act was only one of many reasons for the performance of seppuku; others included the atonement of cowardice, as a means of apology, or following the loss of a battle or the surrender of a castle.

The Japanese tradition of seppuku is a well known example of highly ritualized suicide, within a wider cultural world of norms and symbolism. However, reported examples of suicides exist, in which a person performed disembowelment on themself, without any ambient culture of approved (or expected) suicide.

The Spartan king Cleomenes I is reported, in a fit of madness, to have slit his stomach open, and ripped his own bowels out.

Roman statesman Cato the Younger committed suicide in Utica, after his side lost to Caesar, by plunging a knife in his own gut, in the dead of night. According to Plutarch, Cato's son heard the commotion from a nearby room, and called a doctor who stitched the wound closed; after his son and the doctor left, Cato tore the stitching open with his hand and died. On account of his tragic, highly symbolic suicide, Cato is often termed Uticensis ("of Utica"), in order to differentiate him from his homonymous ancestor, Cato "the Elder" or "the Censor".

In 1593, a suicide occurred in Wimpfen. A young, pregnant woman, who had become a widow a few weeks before, was lying in her bed. She took a large knife, opened her belly in a cross, and threw out the fetus, her own intestines, and dug out her spleen and flung it out as well. She lived for 10 hours after the act, and when the priests sought to bring her a final consolation and blessing, she said it would all be in vain, because she was a daughter of the devil, and was beyond any sort of redemption. Then, she died, was put in a sack, and was thrown in the river. She was affluent, so it was clear that poverty had not driven her to this act.

In 1617, a merchant in the municipality Grossglockau slit his abdomen so that the intestines fell out; he then pulled out his stomach and threw it on his bed. The chronicler notes he lived long enough to regret his action.

== See also ==
- Blood eagle
- List of people hanged, drawn and quartered
- Seppuku
