= Damaspia =

Queen of Persia

- Queen of Persia
- Died: 424 BC
- Spouse: Artaxerxes I
- Issue: Xerxes II
- House: Achaemenid
- Religion: Zoroastrianism

Damaspia (from Old Persian *Jāmāspi- or *ðāmāspyā-) was an Achaemenid queen, wife of the king Artaxerxes I and mother of Xerxes II, his legitimate heir.

== Biography ==
According to the Greek historian Ctesias of Cnidus, King Artaxerxes and his wife died the same day (424 BC, perhaps during a military expedition), and their corpses were carried to Persia. Xerxes succeeded his father, but was murdered not much later (423 BC) by his half-brother Sogdianus.

The epitome made by Photius of Ctesias' book is the only source that mentions Damaspia by name. Documents from Babylon dating in Artaxerxes' reign, refer to certain estates as "the house of the woman of the palace". This anonymous woman could be Damaspia, or the queen mother Amestris. In an episode from the biblical book of Nehemiah (2:6) Artaxerxes is mentioned as being in the company of a royal wife, who could be identified with Damaspia or a consort of lower rank.
