= Battle of Delium =

424 BC military engagement during the Peloponnesian War

Coordinates: 38°20′53″N 23°38′57″E

Battle of Delium (Delion)
- Part of the Peloponnesian War
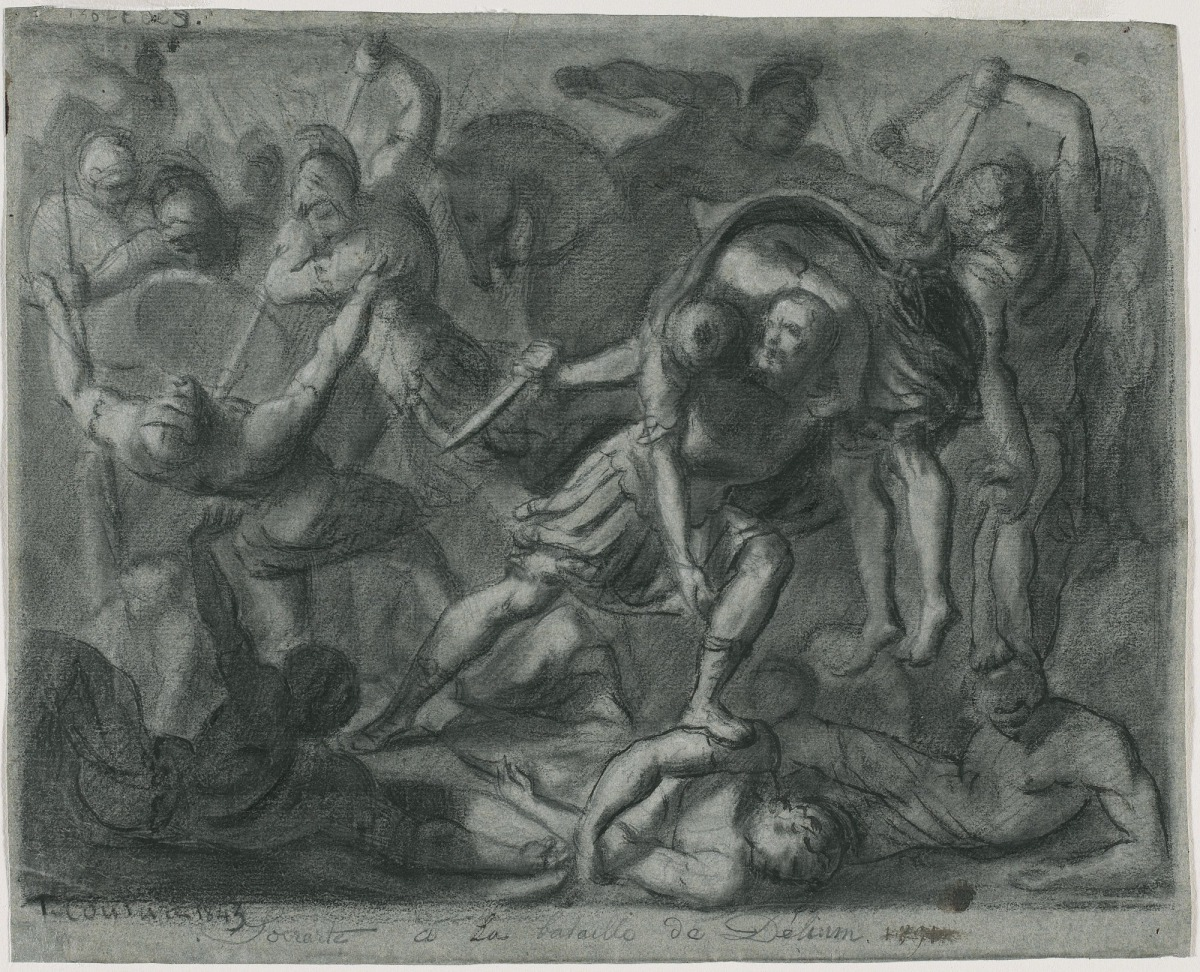
- Socrates at the Battle of Delium (Thomas Couture, 1843)
Date	424 BC
Location	Delium
Result	Boeotian victory

Belligerents
Athens	Boeotia

Commanders and leaders
Hippocrates †	Pagondas

Strength
18,000 total; 7,000 hoplites; 10,000 Metics (Note: most of the Metics and other non-citizens that served with the army were sent back to Attica some time before the battle – how many is unknown); 1,000 cavalry	18,500 total; 7,000 hoplites; 10,000 light infantry; 1,000 cavalry; 500 peltasts

Casualties and losses
About 1,200	About 500

The Battle of Delium (or Delion, a city in Boeotia) took place in 424 BC, during the Peloponnesian War. It was fought between the Athenians and the Boeotians, who were allies of the Spartans, and ended with the siege of Delium in the following weeks.

== Prelude ==
In 424 BC, the Athenian generals Demosthenes and Hippocrates planned to invade Boeotia. Demosthenes mistakenly sailed too early and landed at Siphae, where his plans were betrayed by a Phocian named Nicomachus. As Hippocrates had not yet arrived, Demosthenes could not attack and was forced to withdraw.

Eventually, Hippocrates arrived in Boeotia with 7,000 Athenian hoplites and 1,000 cavalry, they were accompanied by 10,000 Metics and other non-citizens, (Note: some served as light infantry, others were brought along as a labour force to help construct a fortress at Delium) and began to fortify the temple at Delium. After five days, the fortifications were complete, and Hippocrates set up a garrison and sent the rest of his army back to Athens. At the same time, the Boeotians gathered their army to challenge Hippocrates, but when they saw that the Athenians were leaving, many of them thought that it was pointless to attack. Pagondas of Thebes, the commander of the Boeotian forces, urged them to attack anyway because he knew that the Athenians would eventually return and use Delium as a base for further invasions.

== Battle ==
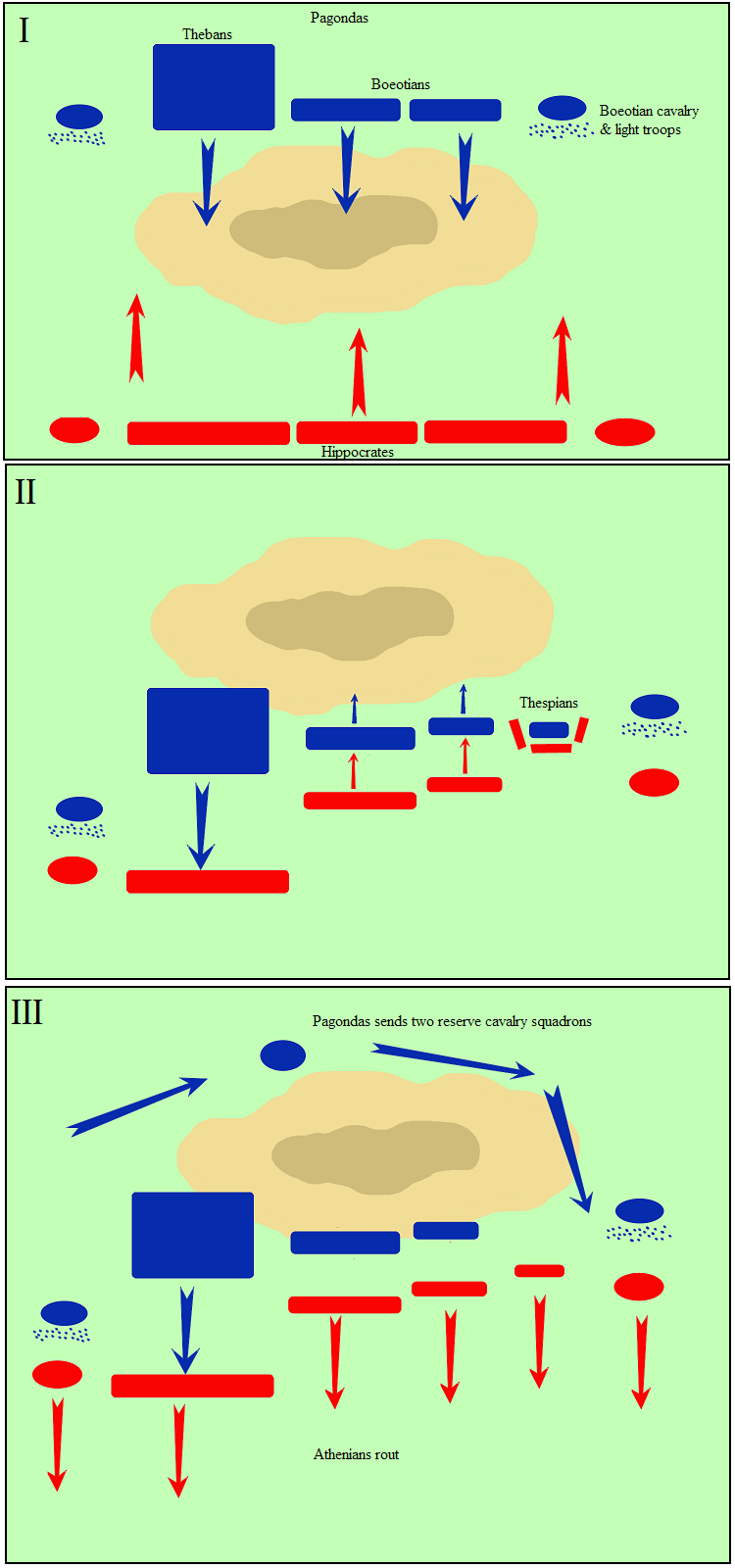
Troop movements during the battle

Pagondas moved his army into position near the Athenians although both armies were hidden from each other by a hill. The Boeotians had 7,000 hoplites, 1,000 cavalry, 500 peltasts and 10,000 light troops. The right wing was formed by troops from Thebes, and the Thebans drew themselves up to a depth of 25 men, rather than the usual 8; the centre by men from Haliartus, Coronea, and Copiae; and the left wing by troops from Thespiae, Tanagra, and Orchomenus. They were later joined by the Locrians. When Hippocrates learned of the Boeotian army, he joined the main Athenian force, leaving 300 cavalry behind at Delium. The Athenians had about the same numbers of hoplites and cavalry, but had fewer lightly armed troops, mostly from their allied cities. They lined up at the usual depth. Because of the asymmetry in deployment, the Theban right wing would almost certainly be victorious but also because of their deployment the Athenian hoplite line was longer and would outflank the Boeotian left line. That unique deployment by the Theban general Pagondas explains the subsequent unfolding and progress of the battle.

The Boeotians charged unexpectedly while Hippocrates was giving a speech to his men. The centre lines saw the heaviest fighting. As Thucydides reports, the Boeotian left wing was surrounded and close to defeat, and only the Thespian contingent stood its ground. The victorious Athenian line got into confusion as it circled round the Thespian contingent and surrounded it. Some of the Athenian hoplites fought and killed one another when they met at the other end, mistaking their countrymen for the enemy. That was history's first documented incident of "friendly fire". It is thought the incident occurred in part because no "state" shield devices were in use, which did not seem to have become general until the Second Battle of Mantinea, fought in 362 BC between the Thebans and the Spartans (and each side's allies) . In any case, Pagondas sent his cavalry to support the Boeotian left wing and the Athenians were defeated in turn. Meanwhile, the Boeotian right wing was also victorious, and the Athenians fighting there fled. When the Athenian centre saw that its two wings had been defeated, it also fled. About 500 Boeotians and 1,000 Athenians had been killed, including Hippocrates.

One of the Athenian hoplites in the battle was the philosopher Socrates. Plato has Alcibiades give the following account of the retreat of the Athenians at Delium, and Socrates' own actions then:

Furthermore, men, it was worthwhile to behold Socrates when the army retreated in flight from Delium; for I happened to be there on horseback and he was a hoplite. The soldiers were then in rout, and while he and Laches were retreating together, I came upon them by chance. And as soon as I saw them, I at once urged the two of them to take heart, and I said I would not leave them behind. I had an even finer opportunity to observe Socrates there than I had had at Potidaea, for I was less in fear because I was on horseback. First of all, how much more sensible he was than Laches; and secondly, it was my opinion, Aristophanes (and this point is yours); that walking there just as he does here in Athens, 'stalking like a pelican, his eyes darting from side to side,' quietly on the lookout for friends and foes, he made it plain to everyone even at a great distance that if one touches this real man, he will defend himself vigorously. Consequently, he went away safely, both he and his comrade; for when you behave in war as he did, then they just about do not even touch you; instead they pursue those who turn in headlong flight.

The Boeotians chased the Athenians until nightfall. Most of the Athenians returned to the fort at Delium, where a Boeotian herald announced that they were offending land that was sacred to the Boeotians and must leave. The Athenians replied that the land was now theirs and was now sacred to them and that they held it in self-defense from the Boeotians.

== Aftermath ==
For two weeks, there was no action, but the Boeotians were joined by 2,000 hoplites from Corinth, as well as other troops from their various allies. The Boeotians constructed a strange device, which, according to the description in Thucydides (4.100), seems to have been a kind of flamethrower and used the weapon to set fire to Delium and chase away the Athenians. Only about 200 Athenians were killed; the rest were allowed to escape. After Delium had been recaptured, Demosthenes and his forces finally arrived, but the lack of communication between him and Hippocrates meant that his arrival was essentially useless. He landed near Sicyon but was quickly defeated.

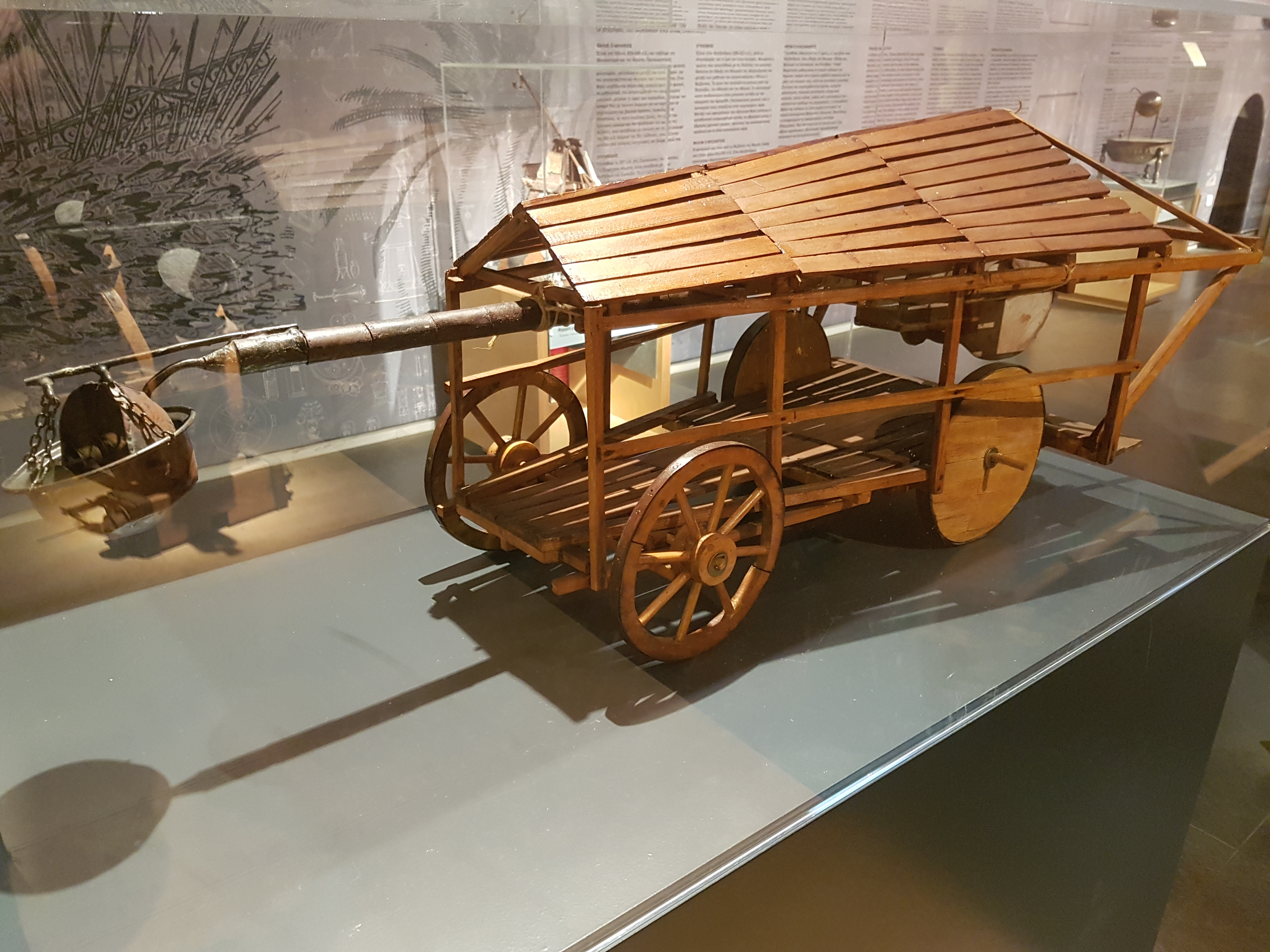
Boeotian flame thrower (model), Thessaloniki Science Center and Technology Museum

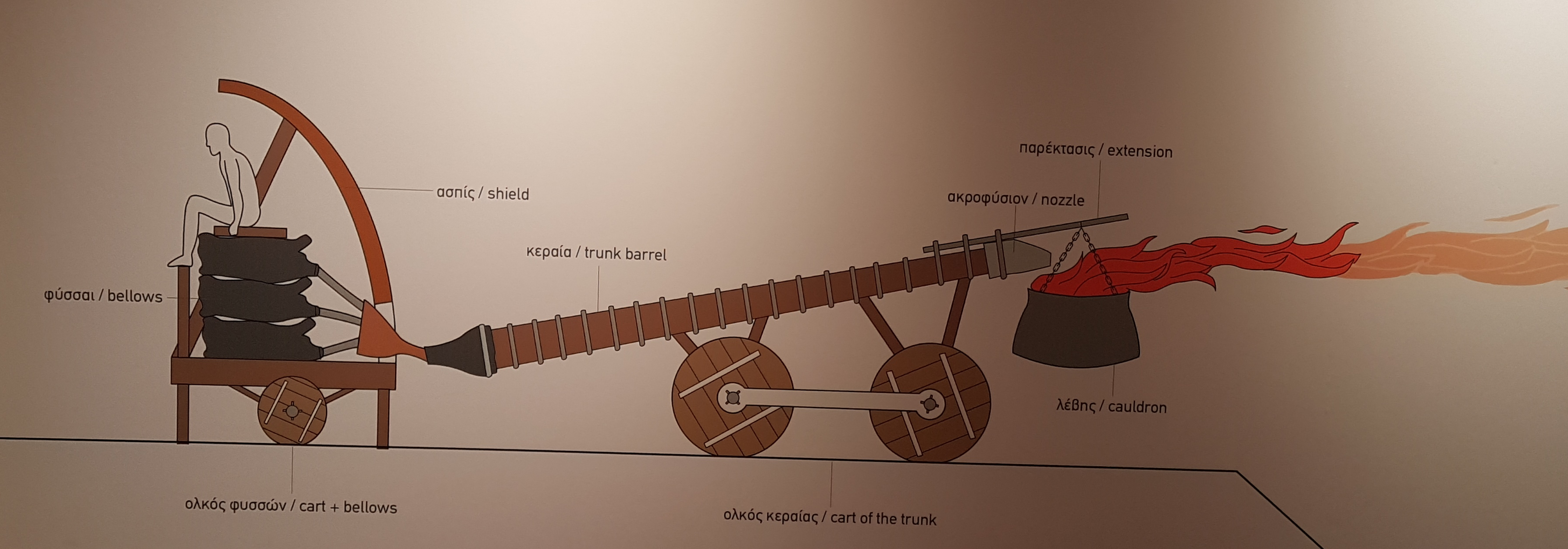
Boeotian Flamethrower. Study-design: Th. P. Tassios Drawing: J. Nakas

In addition to showing an innovative use of a new technology, Pagondas made use of planned tactical warfare for one of the first times in recorded history. In the previous centuries, battles between Greek city-states had been relatively simple encounters between massed formations of hoplites. Cavalry played no important role, and all depended on the unity and force of the massed ranks of the infantry, straining against the opponent. At Delium, Pagondas made use of deeper ranks, reserves, cavalry interventions, light-armed skirmishers (peltasts) and gradual changes in tactics during the battle.

== Sources ==
- Hanson, Victor Davis. Ripples of Battle: How Wars Fought Long Ago Still Determine How We Fight, How We Live, and How We Think. Doubleday, 2003. ISBN 0-385-50400-4
- Plato, Plato's Symposium. Trans. Seth Benardete. Chicago: University of Chicago Press, 2001.
