= Xerxes II =

Ruler of the Achaemenid Empire in 424 BC

Xerxes II 𐎧𐏁𐎹𐎠𐎼𐏁𐎠
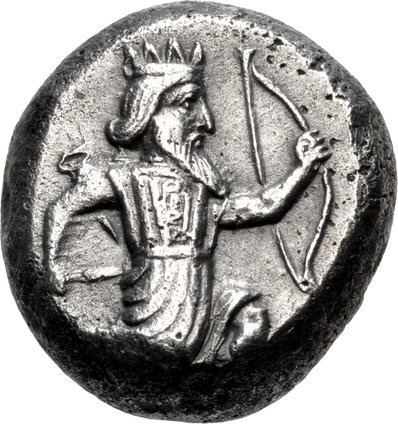
- Achaemenid coin minted at Sardis, possibly under Xerxes II

King of Kings of the Achaemenid Empire, Pharaoh of Egypt
- Reign: 424 BC (45 days)
- Predecessor: Artaxerxes I
- Successor: Sogdianus
- Died: 424 BC; Persepolis, Persia
- Dynasty: Achaemenid
- Father: Artaxerxes I
- Mother: Damaspia
- Religion: Ancient Iranian religion

Xerxes II (/ˈzɜːrksiːz/ ZURK-seez; Old Persian: 𐎧𐏁𐎹𐎠𐎼𐏁𐎠, romanized: Xšayār̥šā; Ancient Greek: Ξέρξης, romanized: Xérxēs; died 424 BC) was a Persian king who was very briefly a ruler of the Achaemenid Empire, as the son and successor of Artaxerxes I.

After a reign of forty-five days—where he only had control over the Persian heartlands—he was assassinated in 424 BC by his half-brother Sogdianus, who in turn was murdered by Darius II six months later. He is an obscure historical figure known primarily from the writings of Ctesias. He was the only legitimate son of Artaxerxes I and Damaspia, and is known to have served as crown prince.

== Reign ==
The last inscription mentioning Artaxerxes I being alive can be dated to 424 BC. Xerxes succeeded to the throne but two of his illegitimate brothers claimed the throne for themselves. The first was Sogdianus, Artaxerxes I's son by his concubine Alogyne of Babylon. The second was Darius II, Artaxerxes I's son by his concubine Cosmartidene of Babylon, who was married to their common half-sister Parysatis, daughter of Artaxerxes I and his concubine Andia of Babylon.

Xerxes II was only recognized as king in Persia and Sogdianus in Elam. Ochus' first inscription as Darius II can be dated to January 10, 423 BC. He was already satrap of Hyrcania and was soon recognized by Media, Babylonia and Egypt. Xerxes II only ruled forty-five days. He was murdered while drunk by Sogdianus, with help from Pharnacyas and Menostanes, who had great influence over him according to Ctesias. Sogdianus gained the support of his regions, but was killed a few months later. Darius II became the sole ruler of the Persian Empire and reigned until 404 BC.

Xerxes II Achaemenid dynasty Died: 424 BC
Preceded by Artaxerxes I	King of Kings of Persia; 424 BC	Succeeded by Sogdianus
Preceded by Artaxerxes I	Pharaoh of Egypt; XXVII Dynasty; 424 BC	Succeeded by Sogdianus
