= Pagondas =

5th-century BC Theban general and statesman

Pagondas (Greek: Παγώνδας), son of Aeolidas, was a Theban general and statesman, who is best known for his command of the Boeotian forces at the Battle of Delium (424 BC) during the Peloponnesian War. His modification of the standard hoplite phalanx and his use of reserve cavalry in that battle constitute what most historians agree is the first recorded use of formal military tactics in human history.

== Biographical information ==
Little is known of Pagondas's life. He is mentioned by Pindar as having been born to a noble Theban family, and we know that he was in his early sixties at Delium. He was evidently a fiery and persuasive speaker, purportedly moving the disparate Boeotian contingents to unify and attack their Athenian enemies through rhetoric alone. Apart from a brief mention by Thucydides, however, there is very little extant information about Pagondas or his life. He seems to have appeared and abruptly disappeared solely for the Battle of Delium.

== Delium ==
At the battle, the Boeotians faced off against a group of Athenians led by Hippocrates. The Boeotians charged down a hill at the Athenian army, while the Athenians, having been surprised by their sudden appearance, got themselves together and charged up the hill. On the Boeotian left were men from the town of Thespiae. On their right, Pagondas had placed his own Thebans. Remarkably though, he chose to stack his Thebans twenty-five shields deep, rather than the standard eight, to give them more pushing-power and punch. This marks the first recorded instance of any Greek general ever changing the standard depth of a hoplite unit.

This novel technique worked wonders, as the Thebans rapidly broke through the Athenian left, and moved to encircle the rest of the Athenian army. However, the Thespians on the Boeotian left were up against the Athenians' crack troops, and were themselves quickly overwhelmed, surrounded, and killed almost to a man. Sensing that his victorious Thebans could not outflank the enemy before the Athenian right broke into his rear, Pagondas chose to do something utterly unprecedented in the annals of Greek warfare. He called in a reserve force (the mere creation of which was itself unprecedented) of several hundred cavaliers to support the now decimated Thespians. The Athenians on the right were stunned by this—so much so that they apparently fell into a confusion and turned tail. This was perhaps fortunate for Pagondas's cavaliers, as Greek cavalry, made up of light-armed aristocrats without saddles or stirrups, was no match for a company of hoplites. Nevertheless, the use of the cavalry reserve broke the Athenian right and, because the Thebans had by now moved into the Athenian rear, caused a general Athenian rout.

Pagondas's victory at Delium helped guarantee Boeotian security, and prevented further Athenian incursions into their territory for the remainder of the Peloponnesian War.

== After effects ==
Pagondas's theretofore unseen employment of tactics in combat set the stage for his fellow Theban Epaminondas's brilliant command at Leuctra (371 BC), considered one of the most astounding tactical victories in the history of warfare. How much Epaminondas learned directly from Pagondas and Delium is lost to history - he was not yet born when the battle was fought, and given Pagondas's age at the battle of Delium it is unlikely the two ever met. Visually, the similarity of their tactics suggests a link, but the 53 year interval raises the question as to whether the use of a deeper phalanx became a staple of Theban tactical lore or had to be reinvented by Epaminondas, perhaps after reading an account of the battle. Furthermore, the tactic of a deeper phalanx had been used by Pelopidas, a compatriot of Epaminondas, at the Battle of Tegyra four years before the Battle of Leuctra. In turn, Philip of Macedon, who was raised in Boeotia as a hostage, was apparently taught by Epaminondas himself and, after Epaminondas's death, by other Theban generals and was a student of the Peloponnesian War, would go on to develop further the tactical ideas originated by Pagondas. In turn, his legacy would be followed and expanded by his son, Alexander the Great.

Historian Victor Davis Hanson, among others, therefore argues that Pagondas's simple use of cavalry reserves and altered troop formations set the stage for the entire military history of the West, and, by extension, the world.

== See also ==
- Socrates
- Alcibiades
- Military tactic
- Military strategy
- Ancient Greece
- Battle of Leuctra
