= Sogdianus =

Achaemenid Empire ruler, 424 to 423 BC

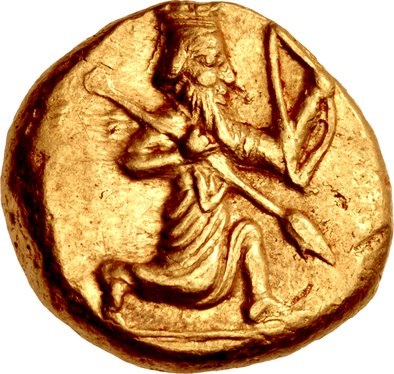
- Achaemenid Daric, possibly under Sogdianus

King of Kings of the Achaemenid Empire, Pharaoh of Egypt
- Reign: 424 BC – 423 BC
- Predecessor: Xerxes II
- Successor: Darius II
- Died: Persepolis, Persia
- Dynasty: Achaemenid
- Father: Artaxerxes I
- Mother: Alogyne of Babylon
- Religion: Ancient Iranian religion

Sogdianus (/ˌsɔːɡdiˈeɪnəs/ or /ˌsɒɡdiˈeɪnəs/; Ancient Greek: Σογδιανός Sogdianos) was briefly a ruler of the Achaemenid Empire for a period in 424–423 BC. His short rule—lasting not much more than six months—and the little recognition of his kingdom are known primarily from the writings of Ctesias; who is known to be unreliable. He was reportedly an illegitimate son of Artaxerxes I by his concubine Alogyne of Babylon.

== Background ==
=== Death of Artaxerxes I ===
The last inscription mentioning Artaxerxes I being alive can be dated to December 24, 424 BC. His death resulted in at least three of his sons proclaiming themselves King of Kings. The first was Xerxes II, who was reportedly his only legitimate son by Queen Damaspia and was formerly the heir. Xerxes II's rule was apparently only recognized in the Persian heartlands. The second was Sogdianus himself, presumed to have initially been recognized only in Elam. The third was Ochus, son of Artaxerxes I by his concubine Cosmartidene of Babylon and satrap of Hyrcania. Ochus was also married to their common half-sister Parysatis, daughter of Artaxerxes I and his concubine Andia of Babylon. The first inscription of Ochus as Darius II can be dated to January 10, 423 BC. He seems to have been recognized by Medes, Babylonia and Egypt. If it is correct that all three declared themselves king at the same time, then the Achaemenid Empire had three King of Kings for a brief period.

=== Rise and fall ===
This chaotic state of affairs would prove short-lived. Xerxes II only ruled for forty-five days. He was reportedly murdered while drunk by the eunuch Pharnacyas and Menostanes, conspirators who sided with Sogdianus, on his orders. According to Ctesias, Pharnacyas had the greatest influence over Xerxes II, next to Bagorazus and Menostanes.

Sogdianus apparently gained the support of his regions and reigned for six months and fifteen days before being captured by his half-brother, Ochus, who had rebelled against him feeling dishonoured he was passed up over Sogdianus for the throne—since he outranked the latter.

Sogdianus was executed by being suffocated in ash per Ochus' promise he would not die by the sword, by poison or by hunger. Pharnacyas was condemned to be stoned to death. "Menostanes was also arrested and condemned, but anticipated his fate by suicide.".

Ochus then ascended to the Achaemenid throne as Darius II; he was the sole ruler of the Persian Empire until 404 BC.

== Name ==
He is called Σογδιανός by Manetho and Diodorus Siculus, and Σεκυνδιανός by Ctesias.

== Sources ==
- Ctesias, 48, 52
- Briant, Pierre, From Cyrus to Alexander: A History of the Persian Empire (2002). Translated by Peter T. Daniels. Winona Lake, Indiana: Eisenbrauns. ISBN 1-57506-031-0.
- Lendering, J., Xerxes II and Sogdianus: ""

Preceded by Xerxes II	King of Kings of Persia; 424–423 BC	Succeeded by Darius II
